= Ban This =

- Directed by: Stacy Peralta
- Produced by: Stacy Peralta
- Starring: Salman Agah; Ray Barbee; Steve Caballero; Tommy Guerrero; Kevin Harris; Tony Hawk; Frankie Hill; Rudy Johnson; Bucky Lasek; Guy Mariano; Mike McGill; Colin McKay; Lance Mountain; Per Welinder
- Distributed by: Powell Peralta
- Release date: 1989
- Running time: 77 minutes
- Language: English

Ban This is a 1989 skateboarding documentary film featuring the Bones Brigade. It presents a commentary on how many people view skateboarders as delinquents or lawbreakers.

== Synopsis ==
The video starts with a scientist posing a question to the viewer, what is skateboarding? Then it cuts to a montage of the skaters in the video. As the video progresses it intercuts skits with the solo video parts of the skaters. These skits are meant to show how ludicrous people's reactions are to skateboarders in an area ridden with robbery, drugs, and prostitution. In one, a cop arrests a kid for skateboarding on the sidewalk. The skits also present the skaters in a "classy" scenario: Four skaters are in a parking lot dressed as golfers. They have caddies and golf bags with skateboards in them. The video is presented as a broadcast of a golf tournament with the quiet commentator marveling at the skill of the players. There are also interjections of a panel of people who oppose everything in the video. For example, they say, "That's not art," following a scene in which the skaters paint on a ramp. The video ends with a downhill scooter race. The skaters in the video battle with each other on their way to the finish. Lance Mountain is victorious and gets the prize and the girl. The video is known for the slow-motion sequences of Tony Hawk demonstrating some of the most difficult tricks and maneuvers of the time.

== See also ==
- Powell Peralta
- The Search for Animal Chin - 1987 skateboard video featuring the Bones Brigade
