= SK8-TV =

- Starring: Matthew Lynn; Skatemaster Tate
- Country of origin: United States
- No. of episodes: 13

Production
- Running time: 24 minutes (approx.)

Original release
- Network: Nickelodeon
- Release: July 4 – September 29, 1990

SK8-TV is a program shown on Nickelodeon that began in 1990 and was originally hosted by Matthew Lillard (who went by the name Matthew Lynn at the time) and Skatemaster Tate. It was a skateboard variety show that featured on-set interviews as well as off site action segments. Various techniques were introduced to television in SK8-TV including hand-held cameras and the use of multi-format film and video. The set for the show was built on location at the Pink Motel in Sun Valley, California, which was famous for its large fish shaped pool that was ideal for skateboarding.

It hosted a wide variety of skateboarders such as Christian Hosoi, Natas Kaupas, a young Tony Hawk and many others that went on to become famous and well known. It was created and produced by original Z-Boys Nathan Pratt and Mark Ashton Hunt from Binder Entertainment, directed by Stacy Peralta, who later went on to direct the retrospective documentary Dogtown and Z-Boys with production design by C.R. Stecyk III. It later resurfaced on the now-defunct Nick GAS channel in 1999 and aired until 2005.

== Episodes ==
=== Season 1 (1990) ===
No. overall	No. in season	Title	Directed by	Written by	Original release date
1	1	TBA	Stacy Peralta	Unknown	July 4, 1990
Appearances by Ray Barbee, Gator, Paul DeJesus, Lori Rigsbee (on location at her home ramp), discussion about board sizes with Lance Mountain, skate photographer J. Grant Brittain, and an interview with Tony Alva.
2	2	TBA	Stacy Peralta	Unknown	July 11, 1990
Appearances by Tony Hawk, Lance Mountain, Colin McKay, Ron Chapman. Highlights from a California Amateur Street League (CASL) contest. Interview with Eric Nash.
3	3	TBA	Stacy Peralta	Unknown	July 18, 1990
Appearances by Ed Templeton, Joe Johnson, Dave Duncan, Mario Rublacava, and Tom Knox.
4	4	TBA	Stacy Peralta	Unknown	July 25, 1990
Appearances by Solomon Agah, Tommy Guerrero, Eric Nash, Steve Salisan, Lance Mountain, and a Hawaiian skate contest.
5	5	TBA	Stacy Peralta	Unknown	August 1, 1990
Appearances by Jim Thiebaud, Tommy Guerrero, Kevin Staab, Reese Simpson, Alphonso Rawls, Ray Underhill. A segment is included on how the Sk8-TV pool was painted.
6	6	TBA	Stacy Peralta	Unknown	August 8, 1990
Appearances by John Swope, Steve Alba, Sal Barbier, Chris Miller, Rudy Johnson, Bucky Lasek, and a bloopers segment.
7	7	TBA	Stacy Peralta	Unknown	August 15, 1990
Appearances by Tony Magnusson, Steve Schneer, Steve and Micke Alba. A skate demo segment, a kids segment, and home viewer clips were also featured in this episode.
8	8	TBA	Stacy Peralta	Unknown	August 22, 1990
Appearances by Jim Thiebaud, Christian Hosoi, and Jason Rogers. Segments featuring skating in Fresno, how skateboarding trucks are made, and Lance Mountain hosting a discussion about skate shoes. were also included in this episode. Interview with Steve Saiz.
9	9	TBA	Stacy Peralta	Unknown	August 29, 1990
Appearances by Kevin Harris, Mark Partain, Guy Mariano, and Eric Sanderson. Segments include host Skatemaster Tate and friends skate in Hollywood and highlights from the Savannah Slamma.
10	10	TBA	Stacy Peralta	Unknown	September 5, 1990
Appearances by Jeff Kendall, Ben Schroeder, Eddie Elguera, Gabrial Rodriguiz, Brad Stradland, and Steve Caballero. Segments include how skateboards are built and "unreal handplants".
11	11	TBA	Stacy Peralta	Unknown	September 12, 1990
Appearances by Dave Hackett, Eddie Reategui (miscredited as "Rategui" in the episode), Jesse Roach, and Mike McGill. Segments include how to redrill boards with Lance Mountain and Eric Dressen is featured in both the Beef Of The Week and the Trick Of The Week.
12	12	TBA	Stacy Peralta	Unknown	September 19, 1990
Appearances by Ray Underhill, Steve and Micke Alba, Omar Hassan, and Chuck Treece. Segments include grip tape with Lance Mountain. Interview with Tony Hawk.
13	13	TBA	Stacy Peralta	Unknown	September 26, 1990
Appearances by Bod Boyle, Jeremy Klein, Eric Sanderson, Andy Howell. Segments include a day with local skate team Team Effigy and Lance Mountain talking about skateboard wheels.
