= Salman Agah =

American skateboarder (born 1972)

Personal information
- Born: July 10, 1972 (age 53) Washington, D.C.

Sport
- Country: United States
- Sport: Skateboarding
- Turned pro: 1989

Salman Agah (born July 10, 1972) is an American professional skateboarder and entrepreneur.

== Early life ==
Salman Agah was born in Washington, D.C. to Persian and Azeri parents. He started skateboarding at the age of 5. After returning to the United States from living in Iran and Europe, he settled with his family in San Jose, California.

== Career ==
At the age of 16, Stacy Peralta spotted Agah, who began riding as a sponsored amateur for Powell Peralta. He joined the Powell team in 1989 along with Steve Caballero, Tony Hawk, Tommy Guerrero, Ray Barbee, and Lance Mountain. He then went on to skateboard professionally for Real Skateboards (owned by Deluxe Distribution) from 1990–1994, and The Firm Skateboards (now defunct) from 1995-2000. Agah spent 14 years on the Vans pro skate team. He was sponsored by Black Label Skateboards from 2000-2017 until he rejoined Powell Peralta, the brand he rides for to this date. During his career as a professional skateboarder, Agah has made significant contributions to the progression of the sport, specifically pioneering switch stance which is riding opposite of your regular stance — the skateboarding equivalent of ambidexterity. He has been recognized as an innovator and legend, having been voted Thrasher Magazine’s Skater of the Year in 1993, Transworld Skateboarding’s Most Influential Skater of the Decade in the 1990s, and Big Brother Magazine’s Most Beautiful Skater.

From 1993-2001, Vans produced the Salman Agah Signature Shoe. Over the years, Agah has endorsed signature products by leading brands such as Spitfire Wheels, RVCA, and Independent Trucks, and traveled the world extensively skateboarding & touring throughout the U.S., Canada, Asia, Australia, Europe, and Central and South America. He participated in the Vans Warped Tour from 1994–2000, was an X Games Competitor in 1997, and a World Cup of Skateboarding Judge from 1995-1998.

Embracing his entrepreneurial spirit, Agah co-founded The Academy of Skateboarding. Specializing in staff development, training, team building, and video production for the skateboard industry, Agah consulted and developed programs for city and private skateparks. The Academy's clients included Vans, Element, Woodward Skate Camps, and various cities in Central and Southern California.

In 2003, Agah established The Skaterade Beverage Co., an internationally distributed functional refreshment specially formulated for skateboarders. Collaborating with artist Shepard Fairey on the package design, Agah acted as President and Managing Director, overseeing sales and promotional marketing, creative direction, production, and warehouse and inventory management. Soon after, he developed Icelounge.com, the very first action sports driven social network, and Skatecoverage.com, a skateboarding media monitoring service.

In 2007, Agah teamed up with skateboard photographer, Mike Ballard, to form SkateBook, a quarterly, hard-bound 350+ page coffee table book featuring skateboarding’s iconic moments, individuals, events, eras and brands. They produced and published four acclaimed, limited-edition books before Agah left the company in January 2009. From 2009-2011, Agah worked as director of business development at The Berrics, alongside Steve Berra and Eric Koston.

Agah was inducted into the Skateboarding Hall of Fame in 2022.

Agah is the founder and owner of the globally recognized brand, Pizzanista!. Its flagship store is located in the Arts District of downtown Los Angeles. Agah expanded globally with locations abroad in both Tokyo, Japan, and Seoul, South Korea. He launched his second location in the Los Angeles area; Pizzanista! San Marino in 2022.

== Personal life ==
Agah now occupies his time operating & growing Pizzanista!, skateboarding, surfing, mountain biking, and riding motocross. He married wife Joan Coulter in 2018, and they have two children, son, Zephyr Ocean, and daughter, Sabbath Spreckels.

== Filmography ==
- Powell Peralta - Ban This (1989)
- Powell Peralta - Propaganda (1990)
- Real - The Real Video (1993)
- Thrasher - The Truth Hurts (1993)
- Real - Kicked Out Of Everywhere (1999)
- Deluxe - World Wide Distribution (1999)
- ON Video - Summer 2000 (2000)
- Vans - Learn To Ride (2000)
- Black Label - Label Kills (2001)
- 411VM - Stand Strong (2001)
- 411VM - Issue 46 (2001)
- 411VM - First Step Skateboarding: Getting Started (2002)
- Black Label - Blackout (2003)
- Thrasher - S.O.T.Y. Video (2003)
- ON Video - Winter 2004 (2004)
- Elwood - 1st & Hope (2006)
- Rising Son: The L*egend of Skateboarder Christian Hosoi (2006)
