= The Search for Animal Chin =

- Directed by: Stacy Peralta
- Written by: Paul Gross and John Smythe
- Produced by: Stacy Peralta
- Starring: Tony Hawk; Steve Caballero; Mike McGill; Lance Mountain; Tommy Guerrero; Rodney Mullen; Mike Vallely
- Music by: Dennis Dragon, William Santschi, Johnny Rad
- Distributed by: Powell Peralta
- Release date: 1987
- Running time: 65 minutes
- Language: English

The Search for Animal Chin is a 1987 skateboarding film featuring the Bones Brigade. It is one of the first skateboarding films to have a plot, rather than simply a collection of skateboarding stunts and music videos.

== Plot summary ==
The Bones Brigade embark on a quest to find the first skateboarder, the mythological Won Ton "Animal" Chin who had gone missing. Their journey takes them to different locations including Hawaii, California, Nevada, and Mexico where they meet friends and skate different spots along the way. It culminates in the discovery of the secret Chin Ramp, a back-to-back double half pipe featuring a spine and a tunnel. They never find the actual Animal Chin, but come to realize that in their search they discover the true meaning of their journey, the pure fun of skateboarding.

== Cast ==
Bones Brigade:

- Tony Hawk - Himself
- Steve Caballero - Himself
- Mike McGill - Himself
- Lance Mountain - Himself
- Tommy Guerrero - Himself
- C. R. Stecyk III - Emerson "Won Ton Animal" Chin - Himself (credited as Emerson Chin)

The film also includes:

- San Francisco Scene: Jim Thiebaud, Jesse Martinez, Bryce Kanights, Doug Smith
- Bakersfield Scene: Chris Borst, Bobby Reeves, Charlie Dubois, Ray Underhill, Adrian Demain, Donny Griffin, Kevin Lambert
- Rad Party Scene: Mike Vallely, Rodney Mullen, Per Welinder, Natas Kaupas, Arron Murray, Kevin Harris, Johnny Rad

Also, in non-skating roles are Skip Engblom as a bouncer and Gerrit Graham as Alan Winters, the head of Slash Skates.

== Production ==
Tony Hawk recalled in an episode of the Hawk vs. Wolf Podcast that the Chin ramp was built in private property without permission. The Chin ramp scenes were shot first, followed by Hawaii and other locations.

== Legacy ==
The iconic ramp featured in the movie was rebuilt at Woodward West Skatepark in Tehachapi, California, for the 30th anniversary of the film. The original Bones Brigade reunited and skated the ramp design that no one had skated in 30 years. The original had been torn down after filming.

== See also ==
- Animal Chin - a late-'90s ska-punk band named after the movie
- Animal Chin - a song by experimental jazz band Jaga Jazzist
