= Gleaming the Cube =

1989 film by Graeme Clifford

- Theatrical release poster
- Directed by: Graeme Clifford
- Written by: Michael Tolkin
- Produced by: Lawrence Turman; David Foster
- Starring: Christian Slater; Steven Bauer
- Cinematography: Reed Smoot
- Edited by: John Wright
- Music by: Jay Ferguson
- Production company: Gladden Entertainment
- Distributed by: 20th Century Fox
- Release date: January 13, 1989
- Running time: 100 minutes
- Country: United States
- Language: English
- Budget: $10 million
- Box office: $2.7 million

Gleaming the Cube (also known as A Brother's Justice and Skate or Die; released in the Philippines as Challenge to Win Again) is a 1989 American film directed by Graeme Clifford and starring Christian Slater as Brian Kelly, a 17-year-old skateboarder investigating the death of his adopted Vietnamese brother.

The skating technical advisor for the film was Stacy Peralta of the Z-Boys and Bones Brigade teams. Many other skateboarders made appearances performing stunts, and a few had small acting roles.

The film received a moderate release in the United States from 20th Century Fox (in 469 theaters). Although the film had a relatively low box office turnout and mixed to negative reviews, it garnered a significant cult following after its theatrical release, through basic cable replays on networks such as USA and the burgeoning VHS (and later DVD) market, and was particularly popular among skateboard enthusiasts.

The title of the film refers to the cryptic question "Have you ever gleemed [sic] inside a cube?" that Garry Scott Davis (GSD) asked Neil Blender in an interview in the December 1983 issue of Thrasher magazine. In the film, Christian Slater's character defines "gleaming the cube" as "pushing your limits to the edge". The DVD contains an Easter egg: by highlighting the skateboard on the main menu, viewers can watch a short featurette entitled "What Does Gleaming the Cube Mean?".

== Plot ==
Brian Kelly is an unmotivated high school student in Orange County, California. An avid skateboarder, Brian is frequently at odds with his parents for his increasingly reckless behavior, which has landed him in jail on more than one occasion. The only person in the family Brian can relate to is his adopted Vietnamese brother Vinh, who works as a shipping clerk for the Vietnamese Anti-Communist Relief Fund (VACRF), an organization which sends medical supplies to Vietnam.

When Vinh discovers a suspicious inaccuracy in VACRF's shipping records, he brings it to his boss Colonel Trac, who fires Vinh when he tries to investigate. Undeterred, Vinh sneaks into Westpac Medical Supplies, the warehouse handling VACRF's shipping, but is apprehended by owner Ed Lawndale. Vinh is interrogated by Lawndale and Bobby Nguyen, another of Colonel Trac's employees, at a motel. When Colonel Trac arrives, it is revealed that he and Lawndale are conspirators in a scheme to smuggle illegal weapons to Vietnam. Convinced that Vinh poses no threat to their operation, Trac intends to set him free, but Vinh is accidentally strangled to death by Nguyen. They hang Vinh's body from a noose, so the police deem it a suicide.

After the funeral, Brian finds the list of medical supplies Vinh was investigating, written in Vietnamese. Looking for someone to translate it, he encounters Bobby Nguyen who starts to follow him. Brian sneaks into the backseat of Nguyen’s car and witnesses a meeting with Trac and Lawndale; Nguyen demands $50,000 and a ticket to Bangkok at gunpoint, but a struggle ensues and Lawndale kills Nguyen. Brian flees to notify the police, but they find no trace of the crime and later learn that Nguyen supposedly arrived in Thailand. Brian tries to convince Detective Al Lucero that his brother did not commit suicide. While skeptical, Lucero offers to look into it.

Suspicious of Colonel Trac, Brian reaches out to Trac's daughter Tina, a fellow high school student and Vinh's ex-girlfriend. After an image makeover, Brian asks her out on a date and the two become closer. He attends one of VACRF's fundraisers, where he notices Lawndale and learns of his connection to Trac and Westpac. Following in his brother's footsteps, Brian sneaks into Lawndale's warehouse and uncovers a shipping crate full of weapons.

Brian causes an explosion at the warehouse and plants evidence to incriminate Trac, but Lucero immediately suspects Brian and admonishes him for the act. However, the incident causes Trac to panic and send his wife and daughter away to his brother's house. A distressed Tina spends the night with Brian instead and discovers a lighter belonging to her father in Brian's room, leading Brian to explain all his suspicions to her. Tina angrily confronts her father about the conspiracy, who is shamed by his involvement and contacts Lawndale to end the operation. In response, Lawndale sends a group of Vietnamese motorcyclists to run Brian down on the street. The police manage to apprehend the bikers and, with the aid of an interpreter, Lucero is able to confirm Lawndale's role in the attack.

Brian visits his friend Yabbo, who builds a newer, faster skateboard for Brian and rallies the rest of the skateboarding clique. Brian and the police both converge upon Colonel Trac's house, where Lawndale holds Tina at gunpoint. When Trac tries to wrestle the gun away, Brian crashes into the room through the window, but Lawndale shoots and kills Trac, then escapes in a police car, dragging Tina along as his hostage. Brian, Lucero, and the entire skateboarding crew pursue and eventually corner Lawndale. As Lawndale takes aim at Brian, he soars through the air on his skateboard and knocks him out, allowing Tina to escape and Lucero to arrest Lawndale. Brian tucks and rolls, surviving the hard landing with relatively minor injuries.

Tina visits Brian in the hospital, where he comforts her for the loss of her father and the shame she feels about his actions. He suggests that they should return to school together, implying that their relationship will continue. Afterwards, Brian and Lucero visit Vinh's grave before driving away.

== Cast ==
- Christian Slater as Brian Kelly
- Steven Bauer as Al Lucero
- Richard Herd as Ed Lawndale
- Le Tuan as Colonel Trac
- Min Luong as Tina Trac
- Art Chudabala as Vinh Kelly
- Ed Lauter as Mr. Kelly
- Micole Mercurio as Mrs. Kelly
- Charles Cyphers as Harvey McGill
- Peter Kwong as Bobby Nguyen
- Max Perlich as "Yabbo"
- Tony Hawk as Buddy
- Christian Jacobs as Gremic
- Kieu Chinh as Madame Trac
- Rodney Mullen as Slaters skate double
- Renowned stuntman Buddy Joe Hooker makes a cameo at the start of the chase scene's freeway segment as the driver whose Corvette gets sideswiped

== Production ==
According to Peralta, locations for the movie were scouted from the sky:

I got to survey Orange County in a helicopter scouting for pools that we might be able to use. Hills. Different street situations that might work for skating locations. And then we'd land and approach the people for permission.

Sites selected for filming included:

- The Anaheim motel in the movie, the "Atomic Age Lodge", was in reality the Stovall's Cosmic Age Lodge on Katella Avenue, across the street from the then-Disneyland parking lot. It was one of a group of Stovall's hotels in the area with a "Space Age" theme (the others being Stovall's Apollo Inn and Stovall's Space Age Lodge and the Inn Of Tomorrow). The Cosmic Age was demolished in the late 1990s to make room for Disney California Adventure. The others have been remodeled and no longer have the space theme.
- Most of the school scenes were filmed at Woodbridge High in Irvine, California.
- The video store, pool hall, and Brian trying to find a translator scenes were filmed along Bolsa Avenue between Magnolia St. and Ward St. in Westminster, California. Street scenes after he leaves the pool hall were filmed in Culver City around Tito's Tacos.
- The Pizza Hut where Tony Hawk's character works is now a Taco Bell, still standing at 2941 West Imperial Highway in the city of Inglewood.
- Some introductory scenes were filmed at John Wayne Airport (Orange County, California) before major renovation work on the terminal.
- The hill scene was filmed on 17th Street between Patton and Leland in San Pedro, California.
- The car chase scene near the end of the movie was filmed on West Seaside Way between the 500 to 700 block in Long Beach, California.
- Brian's ferry ride was from Balboa Island to the Balboa Peninsula where on his bike he met his skateboarding friends at the Balboa Fun Zone in Newport Beach.

Stunt skaters included Mike McGill, Mark "Gator" Rogowski, Rodney Mullen, Rich Dunlop, Eric Dressen, Lance Mountain, Mike Vallely, Chris Black, Ted Ehr, Natas Kaupas, Chris Borst, and Steve Saiz. Tony Hawk (Buddy) and Tommy Guerrero (Sam), then members of the Bones Brigade, appear in the film as members of Brian's skate crew.

Christian Jacobs, who later found fame as singer for The Aquabats and creator of Yo Gabba Gabba!, also appears in the film as Gremic.

== Release ==
Gleaming the Cube was released in the United States on January 13, 1989. In the Philippines, the film was released as Challenge to Win Again in mid-1990.

=== Critical response ===
The film gained mostly negative reviews from critics; only 29% of critics cited on the site Rotten Tomatoes offer a positive review.

== Legacy ==
Professional skateboarder Stevie Williams has stated in an online interview that Slater's character in the film was his first skateboarding influence.

Skateboarding figure Tony Hawk, in a 2008 interview with Slater, revealed that he is continually asked if Slater actually skated in the film. Hawk has remained in contact with Slater well beyond the production of the film.
