= Skatemaster Tate =

American musician and former television show host

Personal information
- Full name: Gerry Hurtado
- Nickname: Skatemaster Tate
- Born: September 9, 1959 Los Angeles, California, U.S.
- Died: October 13, 2015 (aged 56)
- Height: 5 ft 8 in (1.73 m)
- Weight: 200 lb (91 kg)

Gerry Hurtado (September 9, 1959 – October 13, 2015), known professionally as Skatemaster Tate, was an American musician and former television show host.

== Biography ==
Tate was born Gerry Hurtado in Los Angeles, California to his father Jorge, a local machine shop foreman, and his mother Hilda, a clerk at the nearby Knott's Berry Farm. Tate was a top amateur skater in the early 1970s, but in a 1987 People Magazine interview, he downplayed his ability by saying he "only skated for fun". Tate later attended a broadcasting trade school, and applied his trade by working as a DJ in punk rock clubs. From his time in the clubs, Tate took up more interest in the newly growing skate rock movement, and recorded his first song, "Skaterock Rap", in his friend's basement in 1983. Upon its release, it became popular with skaters and Tate came to emcee parties and skate contests in both Los Angeles and New York.

In the mid-80s, Tate was touring as an opening act for the all-girl thrash band Screaming Sirens, and his music was showing up in skate videos. He released his first album, A Way Of Lif, in 1988, and the song "La Cumbre" appeared on the Powell Peralta video Public Domain during a scene where the team tours Mexico. Tate originally wrote the song as a tribute to a local skater hangout. Tate later became the Host of SK8-TV, a half-hour television show on Nickelodeon, with co-host Matthew Lynn (Matthew Lillard, who chose “Lynn” —his first surname Lyn with an extra “n” —as his stage surname). The show only lasted one season and was pulled after 13 episodes.

Since his departure from SK8-TV, Tate has also recorded with such acts as Porno For Pyros and was a producer for the acid jazz group The Stone Boners. His song "Jolt" was later featured in the 1991 comedy What About Bob?

On October 13, 2015, Hurtado died of liver cancer at the age of 56.

== Discography ==
- 1988: A Way Of Life (12", MiniAlbum)
- 1990: Floral Bouquet (LP, Album) Russet /Beware Records
- 1990: Fourth And Broadway - Built For The 90's (Compilation, song "Justice (To The Bass))"
- 1991: Do The Skate (LP, recorded as Skatemaster Tate And Concrete Crew)
- 1991: Justice (To The Bass) (EP, single)

+ 1991 Fourth And Broadway - Re-Birth Of Cool ( Acid Jazz Compilation, Song "Joe's Jam")

=== Producer ===
- 1991: Acid Jazz : Collection Two (producer for The Stone Cold Boners - Words From Your Mother (Land))
- 1991: Totally Wired 5 (producer for The Stone Cold Boners - Too Damn Hard)
- 1991: Totally Wired 6 (producer for The Stone Cold Boners - Lesson One)

=== Appearance ===
- 1988: Public Domain skate video (song: "La Cumbre")
- 1991: What About Bob? soundtrack (song: "Jolt")

== Notes ==
=== References ===
- "He's Not Lean but His Rap Is Mean, So the Thrashers Relate to Skatemaster Tate". People Magazine 27. 23 (Jun 8, 1987): 155
- "Albums – Do the Skate by Skatemaster Tate and the Concrete Crew". Melody Maker 67. 24 (Jun 15, 1991): 44.
- Marlowe, Duff (March 4, 1990). "Rap's Got a Brand New Bag Cuban, Latin and Samoan artists add new elements that reflect L.A.'s diversity". Los Angeles Times. (subscription required)
