= Mike Vallely =

American skateboarder and singer

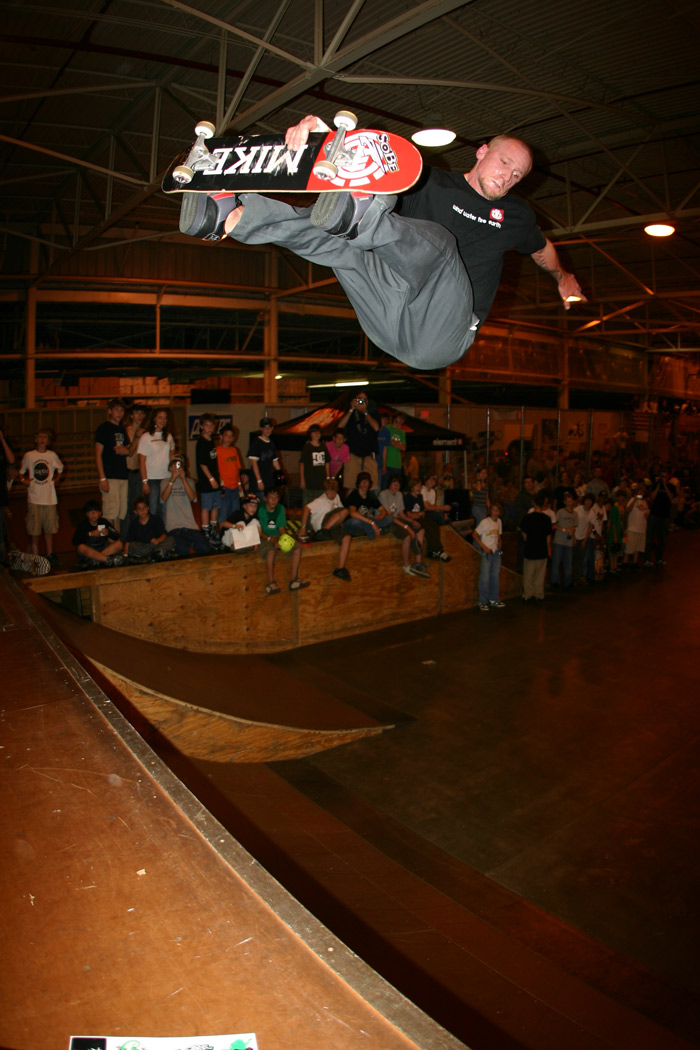
- Vallely performing a head-high frontside air at a demo at Doc*36 Skatepark in Jackson, Mississippi

Personal information
- Nickname: "Mike V"
- Born: 1970 (age 55–56)
- Occupations: Professional skateboarder; singer
- Years active: 1986–present
- Spouse: Ann Vallely (m. 1992)
- Website: mikevallely.com
- Musical career
- Origin: Edison, New Jersey, U.S.
- Genre: Hardcore punk
- Instrument: Vocals
- Member of: Mike V & the Rats, Mike Vallely And The Morning Trail
- Formerly of: Black Flag; Revolution Mother; Resistance; Good for You

Sport
- Country: United States
- Sport: Skateboarding
- Turned pro: 1987

Mike Vallely (/ˈvæləliː/ VAL-ə-lee; born 1970), also known as Mike V, is an American professional skateboarder and musician. From 2013 to 2025, he was the lead vocalist of the hardcore punk band Black Flag. Vallely was the second-longest-serving member of the band, although he did not appear on any albums.

== Early life ==
Born in 1970, Vallely grew up in Edison, New Jersey. He has an older brother, Joe, and a younger sister, Amy. Growing up, Vallely played little league baseball, but, in 1984 at age 14, Vallely discovered skateboarding and punk music, as he quotes in "The Days" by Mike V & the Rats. He then borrowed a skateboard from a friend and proceeded to dedicate his life to skateboarding.

At Christmas in 1984, Vallely's parents purchased a Jeff Phillips professional signature model skateboard for him. Besides street skating, Vallely also began vert skateboarding, and often skated at Tom Groholski's ramp, as well as The Barn Ramp, both of which are located in New Jersey. Vallely also skated at the Brooklyn Banks, a well-known skateboarding location under New York's Brooklyn Bridge.

In 1986, Vallely moved with his family to Virginia Beach, Virginia, for a brief period and, while living there, befriended some local skaters at Kempsville High School. Skating with a local team called "Subculture", in the Kempsville area of Virginia Beach, Vallely tested his street skills in local contests, as well as on neighborhood quarter-pipe and launch ramps. In the spring of 1986, the Virginia Beach Skate park, Mount Trashmore, hosted a professional vert skateboard contest. Vallely and his friend began skating in the car park, adjacent to the vert ramp, during practice, and drew the attention of professional skateboarder, Neil Blender, from atop the ramp. Lance Mountain and Stacy Peralta, both of Powell Peralta and the Bones Brigade, were also impressed with Vallely. Seeing Vallely skate on a worn board, Mountain provided him with a brand new skateboard. Following the impromptu demo, Peralta offered Vallely an amateur sponsorship deal with Powell-Peralta Skateboards.

== Professional skateboarding ==
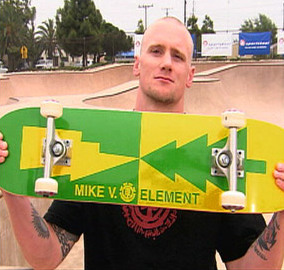
Vallely, c. 2000s

Thrasher Magazine photographed Vallely performing in the handplant circle, one of the photographs appearing on the cover of magazine's August 1986 issue. In July 1986, Vallely's new sponsor flew him to California to compete at the "Street Attack" contest, in Oceanside, California. Vallely won the amateur division, which led to a full-page spread in Transworld Skateboarding's September issue. Also in 1986, Vallely appeared in the third Powell-Peralta video, The Search for Animal Chin, which was released in 1987. Later that year, Vallely became a professional skateboarder at a vert contest in Toronto, Canada on May 31, 1987.

In 1988, Powell-Peralta released Vallely's first professional signature model skateboard. Initially adorned with graphics of a large bug, which was later changed to a graphic that featured an elephant. In 1989, Vallely left Powell-Peralta, at which time the company was the largest skateboarding brand in the world. Following this departure, Vallely became involved with World Industries, a skater-run brand that was conceived of and launched with peers Steve Rocco, Jesse Martinez, and Rodney Mullen. World Industries created the second ever double-kick skateboard design (a skateboard deck with a kicktail at both ends). The first was the Vision Double Tail, which Vallely's double kick was modeled after but with a mellower kick and shorter tail than nose which would become the industry standard. A Vallely signature board was used for the new design's introduction into the retail market.

Vallely was a part of World Industries until early 1991, when he joined New Deal Skateboards, where he stayed until January 1992, before starting the short-lived TV Skateboards with friend and professional skateboarder Ed Templeton. Due to health concerns and financial setbacks, TV Skateboards folded later that year, and Vallely returned to the newly reformed Powell Skateboards in 1993, where he stayed until 1997. Vallely then briefly rode for Transit Skateboards, before joining Black Label Skateboards in 1998, a company that he rode for until 2002. Vallely appeared in the Black Label video Label Kills. Vallely founded Vallely Skateboards in 2002, after he left Black Label. Vallely Skateboards were distributed through Giant Distribution and eventually folded in 2003 due to poor growth.

From 2003 until 2010, Vallely rode for Element Skateboards, before leaving to start yet another company, By the Sword, with fellow skateboarder Jason Filipow. However, the company was short-lived, as Vallely joined the roster of a rejuvenated Powell Peralta Skateboards in late 2010 – his third time with Skate One Distribution – along with Airwalk Footwear and Bones Bearings. In mid-2011, Vallely joined Iron Fist Clothing, as well as Tork Trux as their first team rider, after noticing the company's innovative assembly method; however, Vallely quickly left Tork. A press release from the Swedish skate shoe company, Servant Footwear, was published in February 2013, announcing that Vallely was the first American ambassador and team rider for the brand.

=== Elephant Brand ===
In late 2011, Vallely again resigned from Powell-Peralta and founded Elephant Skateboards in December 2011. In April 2012, Jason Adams – formerly of Black Label and Enjoi – was added to the team roster. On a late June episode of the Ride Channel's Weekend Buzz, the addition of Kyle Berard to the Elephant team roster was revealed.

=== Street Plant ===
In early 2015, Vallely launched a new skateboard company called "Street Plant". As of 2016, the Street Plant team roster includes Vallely, Kristian Svitak and Joey Jett. The company was inspired by the DIY ethic, which influenced Vallely deeply, and the constant pressure from sponsors which constrained his values. After cutting all ties with sponsorships, he established Street Plant along with his family, completely independent of industry financial, distribution and marketing support. Vallely is involved in the addition of personal artwork on the decks and complete skateboard ordered from his house in Long Beach, California.

== Music ==
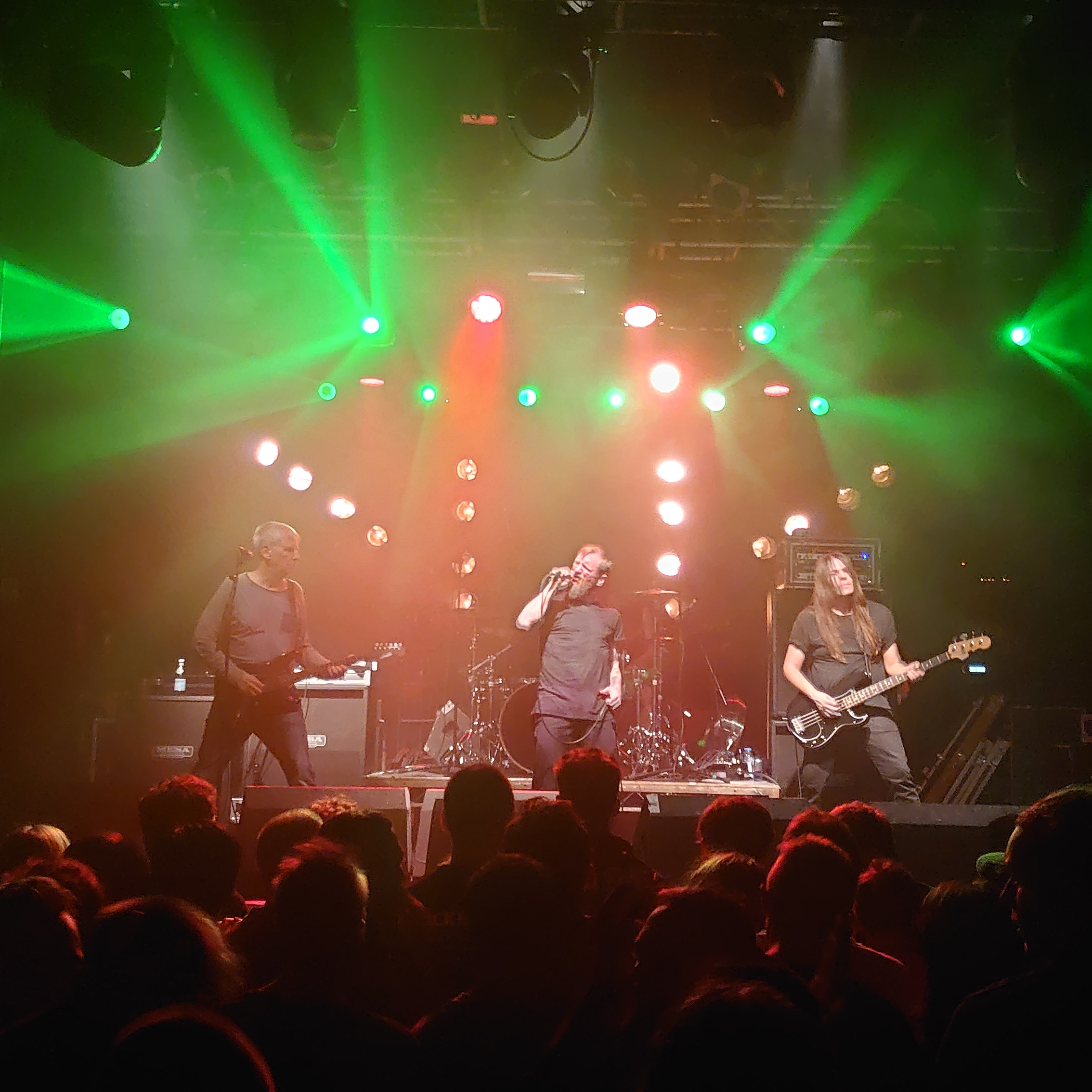
Vallely (center) performing with Black Flag in 2019

Vallely joined a band called Resistance in 1985, although he only played one live show with the group, in which the bands 7 Seconds and Agression also played. Vallely was asked to leave the band for spending too much time on skateboarding.

Vallely was the lead singer for Mike V & The Rats, and the band's song "The Days" appeared in the video game Tony Hawk's Underground (THUG). Their song "Never Give Up" appeared in THUG's successor, Tony Hawk's Underground 2, while another of their songs, "Vendetta", was featured in the following game, Tony Hawk's American Wasteland.

In 2003, Greg Ginn invited Vallely to sing for Black Flag at their 2003 reunion shows in Los Angeles, where he performed the entire My War album.

In 2013, Vallely formed a band called Good for You with Greg Ginn. Their debut album was released on SST Records in February 2013.

In November 2013 during a Black Flag show in Australia, singer Ron Reyes was fired mid-show by the band with Vallely doing the duties of informing him and replacing him on vocals for the remainder of the show. Reyes said that his microphone was taken and he was told to get off the stage by Vallely: "'You're done, party's over get off it's over...' He said something else to me but it was a lie so I won't repeat it here. So with a sense of great relief that it was finally over I left the stage and walked to the hotel room. They finished the set with Mike V on vocals."

In January 2014, founding member Greg Ginn announced Vallely would be the new lead singer of Black Flag. In July 2015, Vallely put together the 'Switchblades & Urethane' music festival taking place at Alex's Bar in Long Beach, California.

=== Discography ===
Good for You

- "Life Is Too Short to Not Hold a Grudge" (2013)

Mike V & The Rats

- "First 3 Songs" (2002)
- "Mike V & The Rats" (2002)
- "The Days" (2003)

Revolution Mother

- "Glory Bound" (2007)
- "Rollin' with tha Mutha" (2009)

Solo career

- "Weekend in Pittsburgh" (2002) with Joe Grushecky
- "California Angel" (2006)
- "Alone" (2006)

Guest appearances

- Jasta (2011) – "Heart of a Warrior"

== Other ventures ==
=== Video game appearances ===
Vallely appears in the Tony Hawk's skateboarding video game series, from the fourth release (Tony Hawk's Pro Skater 4) onwards. He appears as a secret character in Pro Skater 4, but has been featured more prominently in the subsequent releases. In the fifth game of the series, Tony Hawk's Underground, Vallely's ingame character teaches a special trick in the game.

Vallely released his own skateboarding video game for the iPhone and the iPod Touch, entitled Mike V: Do or Die – Skateboarding, in February 2010.

=== Hockey ===
In 2010, Vallely signed a contract to play professional hockey for the Danbury Whalers of the Federal Hockey League, becoming the first-ever professional board sport athlete to play a traditional team sport at a professional level. In his first career game (October 23, 2010), he fought Joe Pelle of the Brooklyn Aviators, a career minor-league enforcer. Several seconds into the fight, Vallely lost his footing and landed awkwardly, breaking his right arm.

=== Podcasting ===
In 2015, Vallely started his own podcast, The Mike V Show, with his friend, author and podcaster Daniele Bolelli.

=== Films ===
Vallely has appeared in several films, including Paul Blart: Mall Cop, The Hangover, The Hangover Part III and XXX.

== Personal life and activism ==
Vallely has been married to his wife Ann since 1992. The couple have two daughters, born in 1992 and 2001. His family has been key in the establishment of some of his ventures, such as Street Plant. They have resided in Des Moines, Iowa since early 2021.

As of 2016, Vallely only agrees to give interviews about animal rights and safety of children athletes.

One of Vallely's daughters, Emily, has been married to former Black Flag drummer Brandon Pertzborn since October 8, 2022.

=== Veganism and animal rights ===
At the age of seventeen, Vallely watched a television program about endangered African elephants which impacted and made him reflect on the harm that humans do to other species. This led him to become a vegetarian and subsequently vegan. His 1988 debut skateboard model had an African elephant as the artwork, because he wanted "to remind people" of them. His third signature model skateboard, 1989's "The Barnyard", had emblazoned the words "Please Don't Eat My Friends" and was one of the first models that promoted vegetarianism. Vallely's vocal opinions on this subject were typically met with derision by both skaters and promoters. In 1999, he and his family abandoned this lifestyle. He later stated that this decision was partly due to compromising himself to please his sponsors and that he felt "lost" for the next fifteen years.

In 2014, Vallely was touring with Black Flag as vocalist and before a show in Louisville, Kentucky he walked through the city and accidentally came across an open slaughterhouse, which "completely crumble[d]" him and motivated to change his diet again. After sharing this decision with his family, they all became vegans in 2015. From 2016 to 2019, his two daughters and wife ran the blog "The Vintage Vegans" which shared cruelty-free fashion and American cuisine options.

Vallely inspired his friend Ed Templeton to become a vegan in the early 1990s.
