= Adrian Demain =

American skateboarder and musician

- Born: December 26, 1966 (age 59)
- Occupation: professional musician

Adrian Demain (born December 26, 1966) is a professional musician and former professional skateboarder based in the San Diego, California area. Demain rode for Powell Peralta as part of the Bones Brigade in the mid-late 1980s. Demain was featured briefly in skateboarding's first video, The Bones Brigade Video Show, and in 1986 was ranked as skateboarding's amateur vertical champion by the National Skateboard Association. He turned pro for House of Kasai in 1987 and retired in 1991. Demain invented skateboarding tricks including the Judo, Anti-Judo and double-kick backside air.

Demain has been performing music professionally since the early 1990s as a guitarist, ukulele player, steel guitarist and singer. For three years he played, recorded and toured the world with Stray Cats' bass player Lee Rocker. Demain has also performed and recorded with Forbidden Pigs, Thee Corsairs, Billy Watson and The International Silver String Submarine Band, Gregory Page (musician), Big Sandy & His Fly-Rite Boys, the Cheap Leis and Brawley. Demain started playing blues and rockabilly, and currently focuses on Hawaiian and jazz classics and American Songbook standards. In a 1984 interview, when asked what music he currently liked, Demain stated: "I listen to a little punk, Youth Brigade, Descendents, and just about anything else. Right now my favorite band is One the Juggler."
