= Steve Steadham =

American skateboarder

Personal information
- Born: February 1963 (age 63) Farmington, New Mexico, U.S.

Sport
- Country: USA
- Sport: Skateboarding

Steve Steadham (born February 1963, in Farmington, New Mexico) is a regular-footed American skateboarding pioneer, former Bones Brigade member, and musician.

== Early life ==
Steadham grew up in Las Vegas and California, going to high school in Las Vegas. He started seriously skateboarding when he was 17. In 1981, Steadham moved to California.

== Skateboarding ==
Steadham worked in the Whittier skatepark's pro shop where Lance Mountain was his co-worker. Neil Blender, Lester Kasai, and John Lucero were also locals at the park. Steadham helped popularize the boneless.

Within two years of moving to California, Steadham signed to Powell & Peralta. Steadham turned pro in 1984 for Powell. After riding for Powell for over a year, Steadham left Powell and started his own company: Steadham Skateboards.

=== Stedmz Skateboard ===
Steadham Skateboards evolved in to Stedmz Skateboards.

Skate Video Parts & Appearances	Year
Bones Brigade Video Show	1984

== Music ==
Steadham is in three bands: Citizen X, Funkenstein and Freight Train.
