= The Bones Brigade Video Show =

1984 skateboarding video

The Bones Brigade Video Show is a 1984 skateboarding video, produced by Stacy Peralta and Craig Stecyk.

It was the first of several videos produced by the Powell Peralta company, and showcased members of the Bones Brigade skateboarding team, including Steve Caballero, Tony Hawk, Mike McGill, Lance Mountain, Rodney Mullen, Stacy Peralta, and Per Welinder.

It was expected to sell just 300 copies on VHS, but it sold 30,000.
