= No comply =

Skateboarding trick

The no comply is a skateboarding trick that was invented by John Lucero and then named and popularized by the skater Neil Blender in the 1980s.

== Features and history ==
To do the trick, the rider must plant their front foot and pop the board with only their back foot. The trick is usually done on flat ground.

The no comply was originally introduced in Thrasher magazine in 1988, as a “how to” trick, performed by Natas Kaupas. It is a curb or parking block trick where the front foot is planted first on the curb and the back foot "bonks" the back truck off the curb/parking block, bouncing the board up and off-landing back on riding away.

There are many variations of the no comply, probably the most common being the Frontside 180 variation. Ray Barbee is credited for expanding on the no comply and inventing many of the variations. Practically every flip trick that can be performed with an ollie also has a no comply counterpart.
