= Thrashin' =

- Theatrical release poster
- Directed by: David Winters
- Written by: Paul Brown; Alan Sacks
- Produced by: Alan Sacks
- Starring: Josh Brolin; Robert Rusler; Pamela Gidley
- Cinematography: Chuck Colwell
- Edited by: Lorenzo DeStefano; Nicholas C. Smith
- Music by: Barry Goldberg
- Production company: Winters Hollywood Entertainment Holdings Corporation
- Distributed by: Fries Entertainment
- Release date: August 29, 1986
- Running time: 92 minutes
- Country: United States
- Language: English

Thrashin' (released in the Philippines as Challenge to Win: Thrashin') is a 1986 American skater drama film directed by David Winters and starring Josh Brolin, Robert Rusler, and Pamela Gidley.

The film features appearances from many famous skaters such as Tony Alva, Tony Hawk, Christian Hosoi and Steve Caballero. The film also stars Sherilyn Fenn, who was cast by the director, together with her boyfriend at the time Johnny Depp, who was later rejected by the producer. The Red Hot Chili Peppers make an appearance in the film as well.

== Plot ==
Corey Webster is an amateur skateboarder from out of town who is staying in Los Angeles with friends in hopes of competing and winning a downhill competition for which he has been training. During his stay in LA, he falls for a beautiful blonde named Chrissy, who happens to be the younger sister of Hook, the leader of "The Daggers," a tough punk rock skateboard gang in the Los Angeles/Venice Beach areas. Chrissy is not a Dagger but has come from her home in Indiana to stay with her brother in L.A. for the summer.

Corey and his crew, "The Ramp Locals," often have confrontations throughout the film because of Corey's defiance of Hook when asked not to come around or call Chrissy again. Chrissy, however, can choose her relationships and has the opposite interest. Corey disobeys and is chased by The Daggers on a skateboard through city streets and a parking garage. He barely escapes by boarding a bus and exiting through the back door and onto the roof while the rival gang members search the bus cabin. Upset at Corey, The Daggers find The Ramp Locals' half-pipe and burn it to the ground, thus creating more drama between the two skate crews.

After an earlier confrontation, Corey and Hook meet up that night at the "Dagger house" (a punk rock house overrun with Daggers and graffiti, quite typical in the 1980s throughout Los Angeles communities). The rivals joust in the Bronson Canyon ditch until Corey is injured and the police arrive. With Corey's arm broken, he is convinced he cannot compete in the downhill and places blame on Chrissy, who fled with the Daggers as the police were arriving, but in protest reminds him that she had begged him not to engage in the duel in the first place. As Chrissy drives away, Corey runs outside to try to make up with her, but she doesn't hear him behind her. An emotionally upset Chrissy arrives at the Daggers' house, tells her brother she is returning to Indiana and asks to be driven to the bus station in the morning; she goes upstairs to pack. Later, Corey skates over to the Daggers' house looking for Chrissy. Still, Hook's girlfriend tells him that she has already taken Chrissy to the bus station, that she doesn't have a phone number, and that Chrissy was crying inconsolably when she returned. These are all lies; Chrissy is still upstairs packing. Later that night, Chrissy and her brother have a heart-to-heart about his protectiveness of her as he drives her to the bus station, where she gets on the bus to Indiana.

Meanwhile, Corey mopes around. He starts to miss Chrissy and begins to practice downhill skateboarding. With a broken arm, he has to be very cautious, and he proves unable to perform well. Having doubts, Chrissy exits her bus on the highway and hitchhikes back to Los Angeles just in time to see Corey and Hook battle it out in the last turn of the downhill race. Hook flies over the side of the road, and Corey speeds through the finish line at 63 MPH off a ramp and into a crowd of fans who cheer him in victory. He is awarded a professional contract with Smash Skates and enough money to rebuild the ramp destroyed by the Daggers. Hook tells Corey that he respects his skill and approves of Corey's relationship with Chrissy, seeing Corey as worthy and respectful and having taken his talk with Chrissy to heart. In respecting Corey, Hook, for the first time, is looked at as respectable as well.

== Cast ==
- Josh Brolin as Corey Webster
- Robert Rusler as Tommy Hook
- Pamela Gidley as Chrissy
- Chuck McCann as Sam Flood
- Brooke McCarter as Tyler
- Josh Richman as Radley
- Brett Marx as Bozo
- David Wagner as Little Stevie
- Tony Alva as T.A.
- Mark Munski as Monk
- Sherilyn Fenn as Velvet
- Rocky Giordani as Skate Club Bouncer
- Steve Whittaker as Bus Driver
- Per Welinder as himself
- Red Hot Chili Peppers as themselves

== Production ==
Director David Winters, upset after being overruled on a casting decision for Thrashin', made the professional decision to control all aspects of future projects he worked on. Winters' first choice was a pre-21 Jump Street Johnny Depp who was cast in the film together with Depp's girlfriend at the time, Sherilyn Fenn, but after three attempts to get Depp approved by the producer, Winters had no choice but to recast, ultimately casting Robert Rusler.

== Release ==
Thrashin' was released in the United States on August 29, 1986. In the Philippines, the film was released as Challenge to Win: Thrashin' by Bell Films on October 9, 1987.

== Reception ==
Contemporary reviews of the film were largely dismissive. Joe Baltake, writing for the Philadelphia Daily News, panned it as derivative. He described it as a mere replay of the "bad" and "unfortunate" 1986 BMX film Rad and "uncomfortably similar to West Side Story." He was further unimpressed by the skateboarding shown in the film. Writing for the Los Angeles Times, Michael Wilmington similarly derided the plot as "vacuous" and the premise as clichéd but found the skateboarding to be well-shot and visually interesting. He conceded that the film was "entertaining on the technological level."

=== Legacy ===
The board sport industry continues to describe this film as "legendary".

Sixteen years after the initial film release, the MTV series Jackass, in a February 2002 episode, played homage to the "jousting scene" with "maces and man-purse".

== Soundtrack ==
The film features a performance from the Freaky Styley incarnation of the Red Hot Chili Peppers, with Cliff Martinez and Hillel Slovak, as well as music by Devo, Circle Jerks and Meat Loaf. Some of the bands featured in the film went on to have number one records.

Collapsible song list
Song name	Performed by	Written by	
"Thrashin'"	Meat Loaf	Larry Lee, Alan Sacks and Jodi Sacks-Micheli Produced by Larry Lee	
"That's Good"	Devo	Gerald Casale, Alan and Mark Mothersbaugh (presumably a miscredit to Alan Myers, as there is no Alan Mothersbaugh in Devo)	Courtesy of Warner Bros. Records
"Tequila"	Chuck Río		Published by J.A.T. Music
"Arrow Through My Heart"	Jimmy Demers	Mike Piccirillo and Gary Goetzman	Produced by Mike Piccirillo
"Want You"	The Bangles	Vicki Peterson	Courtesy of A&M / IRS Records
"Blackeyed Blonde"	Red Hot Chili Peppers	Anthony Kiedis, Michael Balzary, and Cliff Martinez	Courtesy of E.M.I. Records
"Don't Think Twice"	France Joli	Britta Phillips, Ned Liebman and Derek Meade	Produced by Mike Piccirillo and Gary Goetzman
"Touch the Sky"	White Sister	Bernie Shannahan	Produced by Mike Piccirillo
"Dancin' in Jamaica"	The Tribe	Gary Goetzman and Mike Piccirillo	Produced by Mike Piccirillo and Gary Goetzman
"Playground"	The Truth	Dennis Greaves and Michael Lister	Courtesy of IRS Records
"Hey"	Fear	Lee Ving	Courtesy of Fear / Restless Records
"Maniac"	The Screaming Sirens	Rosie Flores	Courtesy of Enigma Records
"Let the Love Begin"	Jimmy Demers and Carol Sue Hill	Gloria Sklerov and Lenny Macaluso	Produced by Gloria Sklerov and Lenny Macaluso
"Wild in the Streets"	The Circle Jerks	Garland Jeffreys	
"Burnin' (For You)"	Rebel Faction	T. Quinn and L. Hester	Produced by Larry Lee
"Staring Down the Demons"	Animotion	Don Kirkpatrick and Randy Sharp	Courtesy of Polygram
"Couldn't Care More"	Fine Young Cannibals	David Steele and Roland Gift	Courtesy of IRS Records
