= Per Welinder =

Swedish skateboarder and entrepreneur

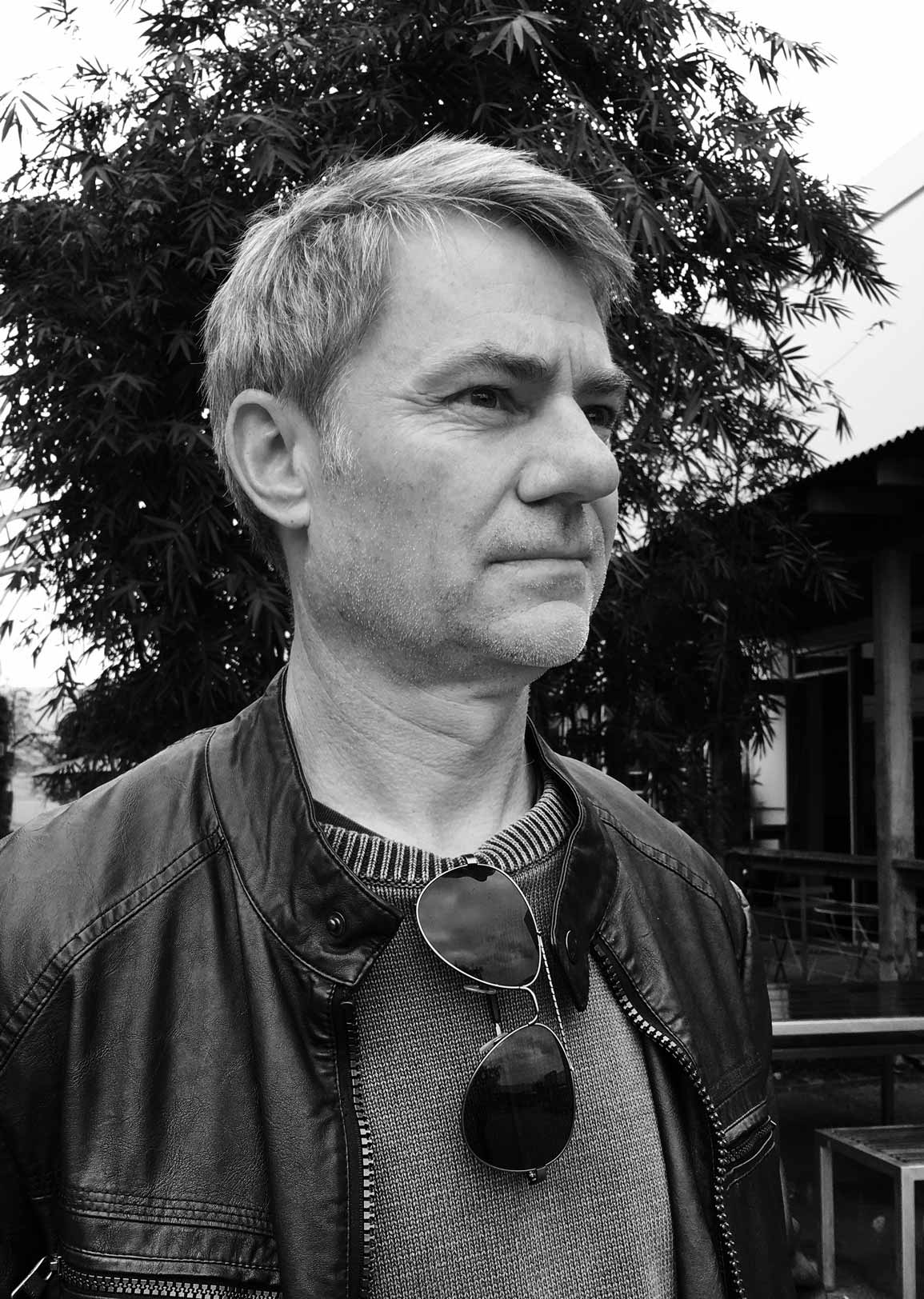
- Welinder in 2016
- Born: April 17, 1962 (age 64); Täby, Sweden
- Education: UCLA (M.B.A.)
- Occupations: Investor; venture capitalist; entrepreneur; professional skateboarder
- Known for: CEO of Blitz Distribution; Board Director of International Association of Skateboard Companies

Per Nils Welinder (born April 17, 1962) is a Swedish entrepreneur and former professional skateboarder. During the 1980s he achieved international fame as a freestyle skater and was a leading member of the Powell-Peralta skate team known as the "Bones Brigade". He had a number of influential video parts with Powell during the 1980s, a series of signature models, and roles in several Hollywood movies. Welinder also has the unique distinction of being the only person to have ever beaten Rodney Mullen in a professional skate contest.

== Biography ==
Welinder was born in Täby, just outside Stockholm. In the 1980s, Welinder and Rodney Mullen were competitors in freestyle skateboarding, and Welinder regularly placed second to Mullen's first place. At a 1983 contest, Mullen skated uncharacteristically below form and Welinder won.

Mullen retired for a year and was soon allowed to return to the scene, overshadowing Welinder and all the other freestylers, but Welinder consistently was the second most popular freestyler in skateboarding. In addition to his freestyle board model, Welinder also had a street model (which was unusual for a freestyler) and this board - with its well-regarded graphic and long nose - was one of the most popular among skateboarders for a few years. This was followed by an unusual, hybrid model of his in 1990 called the "Nordic Sperm", which also sold relatively well.

Welinder was featured prominently in the Bones Brigade videos "The Bones Brigade Video Show", "Future Primitive", and "Ban This". In January, 1992, he left Powell Peralta to start a new skateboard company, Birdhouse Projects, with fellow team member Tony Hawk as his partner and main attraction. As Tony Hawk began to achieve superstardom when skateboarding's popularity increased in the mid-1990s, Welinder became a very wealthy man.

In 2003, Per Welinder Co-created Go Skateboarding Day with Don Brown while Brown was the IASC Marketing Director.

In 2012, Welinder teamed up with longtime skateboard advocate Peter Whitley to author Mastering Skateboarding, which features high-quality full-color photo sequences of all the biggest tricks while spanning techniques and equipment for riders of every level.

In early 2018, Welinder teamed up with Chinese venture investor Curt Shi — a skateboard amateur himself — to launch early-stage angel fund WelinderShi Capital, focusing on bringing western lifestyle brands to China.

== Appearances in 1980s culture ==
Per Welinder was a stunt double for some of Michael J. Fox's skateboard scenes in the classic 1985 time travel movie Back to the Future. The year after, he played the part of "Per", a Venice freestyler, in the movie Thrashin'.

In 1986, Welinder was featured in a music video for the Blue Öyster Cult song "Dancin' in the Ruins", from the album Club Ninja.
