= Stacy Peralta =

American skateboarder, screenwriter, film director

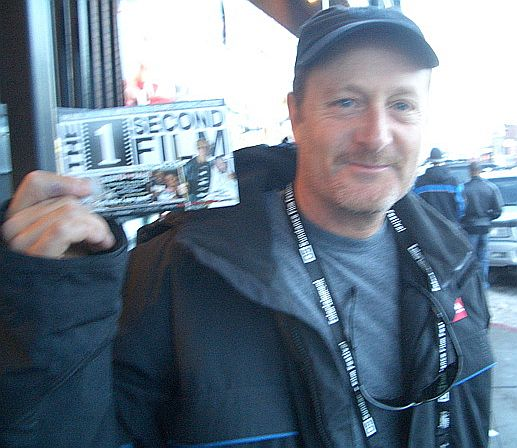
- Peralta in 2005 holding a producer credit for The 1 Second Film
- Born: Stacy Douglas Peralta; October 15, 1957 (age 69); Venice, California, U.S.
- Occupations: Film director, entrepreneur, former professional skateboarder
- Known for: Co-founder of Powell Peralta
- Spouses: Joni Caldwell (m. 1989; div. 1990) Gemma Vizor (m. 2001)
- Children: 2, including Austin Peralta (deceased)

Stacy Douglas Peralta (born October 15, 1957) is an American film director and entrepreneur. He was previously a professional skateboarder and surfer with the Zephyr Competition Team, also known as the Z-Boys, from Venice, California.

== Early life ==
Peralta was born in Venice, California, of Mexican and Irish descent. At age 15, he began competing with the Z-Boys, a group sponsored by the surf shop Jeff Ho Surfboards and Zephyr Productions. His second sponsor was Gordon and Smith. Peralta graduated from Venice High School in 1975.

== Career ==
=== Skateboarding ===
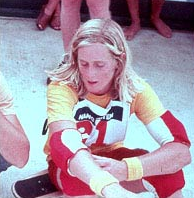
Peralta circa 1976

At the age of 19, Peralta became the highest-ranked professional skateboarder. Soon after, he joined forces with manufacturer George Powell to form Powell Peralta, which would grow to be one of the most successful skateboard brands of the 1980s. With the financial backing of Powell-Peralta, Peralta formed the seminal Bones Brigade, a team composed of some of the best skaters at the time, many of whom revolutionized modern skateboarding.

=== Film work ===
In 1984, Peralta also directed and produced the first-ever skate video, the Bones Brigade Video Show.

Peralta is also credited in the 1985 movie Real Genius, playing the commander of a fictional space vehicle delivering a deadly laser blast to an unsuspecting criminal during the film's opening scene.

Peralta served as the Second Unit Director and Skating Technical Advisor in the 1989 film, Gleaming the Cube, directed by Graeme Clifford and starring Christian Slater. The movie featured a number of skateboarders from the Powell-Peralta team after screenplay writer Michael Tolkein became impressed with the skaters' abilities. As Peralta stated in 1987: "[Tolkein] never realized how into skating he would become. And he really has captured an authentic feel of what skating is about."

In 1992, Peralta left Powell-Peralta to direct and produce for television full-time. His love of skateboarding manifested itself in Dogtown and Z-Boys, a documentary film co-written with CR Stecyk III, regarding the legendary skateboard team known as the Z-Boys. The film, produced by Agi Orsi, reinforces the conviction that in the 1970s, much of the attention of the skateboarding media centered on Dogtown. Dogtown won Director's and Audience Awards for documentary at the 2001 Sundance Film Festival. In 2003, Peralta's experience as an entrepreneur and skate video filmmaker was adapted for the video game Tony Hawk's Underground. Peralta also did cameo work for the game in which he played himself.

Peralta also directed Riding Giants, a 2004 documentary of the history of modern big wave surfing and tow-in surfing. Following that, Peralta wrote the screenplay for the dramatic re-telling of the Dogtown days with Lords of Dogtown (2005). His 2008 documentary, Crips and Bloods: Made in America, focuses on gang violence in South-Central Los Angeles. This film provides insights into the origins of the infamous Crips and Bloods street gangs, and also offers a look at the social injustice in Los Angeles in the 1950s and '60s.

In 2008, Peralta directed a series of television commercials for Burger King in which the Greenlandic Inuit, Transylvanians of Romania and Hmong of Thailand, known as "Whopper virgins" in the ads, were offered their first taste of a fast food hamburger and asked to compare Burger King's Whopper to McDonald's Big Mac. Peralta subsequently came under attack for what some deemed exploitation of native peoples.

In 2012, Peralta produced Bones Brigade: An Autobiography, which chronicles the Powell-Peralta skateboarding team of the same name. It includes interviews with Rodney Mullen, Craig Stecyk, Tony Hawk, Lance Mountain, Steve Caballero, and Peralta himself, among others.

In 2013, Peralta co-produced, along with Paul Taublieb and Agi Orsi, a documentary for the ESPN series 30 for 30, entitled Hawaiian: The Legend of Eddie Aikau. The film chronicles the life of famed big wave surfer Eddie Aikau, who died while attempting to rescue his crewmates after their Polynesian voyaging canoe capsized in 1978. In 2014, the film won an Emmy Award for Best Sports Documentary.

== Personal life ==
Divorced in the 1990s, Peralta had one son, pianist Austin Peralta, who died on November 21, 2012 at the age of 22.

== Filmography ==
=== Film ===
Year	Title	Role	Notes
1985	Real Genius	Shuttle Pilot	Comedy
1987	The Search for Animal Chin	Director, producer	Action film
1989	Ban This	Director, producer	Feature documentary
1989	Gleaming the Cube	Second Unit Director, Skating Technical Advisor	Feature Film
1996	When Disasters Strike	Director	TV movie
1998	America's Teenagers Growing Up on Television	Director	TV movie
1999	Influences: From Yesterday to Today	Director	TV movie
2000	The 70s: The Decade That Changed Television	Director, producer	TV documentary
2001	Dogtown and Z-Boys	Director, writer	Feature documentary
2004	Riding Giants	Director, producer	Feature documentary
2005	Lords of Dogtown	Writer	Feature film
2006	Pipeline Masters	Narrator, producer	Feature documentary
2008	Crips and Bloods: Made in America	Director, writer, producer	Feature documentary
2012	Bones Brigade: An Autobiography	Director, producer	Feature documentary
2013	Hawaiian: The Legend of Eddie Aikau	Producer	Feature documentary
2022	The Yin and Yang of Gerry Lopez	Director, producer	Feature documentary

=== Video games ===
Year	Title	Role	Notes
2003	Tony Hawk's Underground	Himself	

=== Television ===
Year	Title	Role	Notes
1978	Blue Peter	Himself	February 2nd 1978 episode.
1979	Charlie's Angels	Kid on skateboard	The Prince and the Angel episode
1992	Nickelodeon Wildside Show	Director	Nature show
1995	Mr. Show with Bob and David	Title designer/director, episode 103	Sketch comedy show
