= Ray Barbee =

American skateboarder and musician

- Born: October 5, 1971 (age 54); San Jose, California, U.S.
- Genres: Jazz, indie
- Occupations: Musician, skateboarder
- Instruments: Guitar, bass, xylophone, drums
- Label: Galaxia Records
- Website: galaxiarecords.com/artist/ray-barbee

Ray Barbee (born October 5, 1971) is an American skateboarder and musician from San Jose, California.

== Skateboarding ==
Barbee was one of the first skateboarders to bring freestyle/flatland tricks to street, technical ollie combinations and numerous no comply variations. He is best known for his no complys and fluid style.

Barbee appeared in the Powell Peralta videos Public Domain, Ban This and Propaganda. Barbee also appears in the video games Skate 2 and Skate 3 as a playable skater.

In 1987, when Barbee was 15 years old, he was introduced in the New AMs section of the Bones Brigade Intelligence Report, which included a photo of Barbee performing a handrail boardslide on a "ripper deck and street bones."

In 1991, Barbee left Powell Peralta for The Firm Skateboards (now defunct), headed by another Powell veteran, Lance Mountain.

Barbee has a signature shoe with Vans. His other sponsors are Independent Truck Company, and WeSC.

Barbee is also known as a photographer and takes pictures with analog cameras such as a Leica M6.

== Music ==
A music writer and multi-instrumentalist, Barbee released his debut EP on Galaxia Records in 2003, Triumphant Procession, a collection of jazz-influenced instrumental tracks which Barbee produced and engineered in his home studio. His 2005 release, In Full View, also on Galaxia, featured guests appearances by drummers Doug Scharin (of HiM and June of 44) and Carlos de la Garza (formerly of Reel Big Fish) as well as saxophone player Glen Darcey. Barbee plays guitar, bass guitar, drums, harp and xylophone.

In March 2007, Barbee recorded in Japan with the Mattson 2. That recording became Ray Barbee Meets The Mattson 2, a collaboration melding the guitar/drums of the Mattson 2 with Ray Barbee playing additional guitar. When playing live together, Ray sometimes assumes a dual bass line/lead role (both on his guitar) during the set.

Barbee is also known for his live performance solo work using looping delay pedals and drum machines. His music has been featured on NPR and has been used in a number of surf videos.

He is sponsored by Fender Guitars.
