= Mike McGill =

American skateboarder (born 1964)

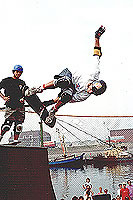
- McGill in 1987
- Born: September 2, 1964 (age 61)
- Occupation: Professional skateboarder

Mike McGill (born September 2, 1964) is an American skateboarder who is best known for inventing the trick "McTwist", an inverted 540-degree mute grab aerial.

== Professional skateboarding ==
=== McTwist ===
A McTwist is a transitional trick that was invented by McGill and consists of a front flip combined with a 540-degree rotation. McGill first performed the manoeuvre on a wooden half-pipe in Rättvik, Sweden in 1984 and then at the Del Mar Skate Ranch's concrete bowl, called The Keyhole, when he returned to the United States (U.S.). McGill was inspired by Fred Blood, who had performed a 540 on roller skates, and only a small number of professionals could successfully complete the trick at the time of its invention—Lester Kasai was the second skateboarder to successfully land the McTwist after McGill. McGill recounted his experience in Sweden in a 2004 Thrasher article:

"Okay," I thought, "if I could just get past the 400-degree mark I could bail out to my knees and not land on my head." After a couple dozen tries it happened and I landed one with speed, just like that ... Before long everybody showed up, saying, "Okay, let's see it." So I did, but it wasn't half-way up the wall as they all suspected; it was about four-feet out, which was actually easier for me to see what I was doing. Lance [Mountain] proceeded to grab his skate stuff and did a full body jar with his body over the coping trying it. The next day he took a sequence of it with a single shot camera for the Bones Brigade Intelligence Report, and made me do it 27 times in the same spot. Rodney Mullen then named it the McTwist.

The original version of the McTwist performed on the large ramp in Sweden involved a flatter spin largely aligned to the vertical plane of the ramp. The notable inversion or front flip that is now synonymous with the McTwist developed when McGill and other skaters transitioned the maneuver to smaller ramps and pools on their return to California.

The trick is derived from a combination of the "Mc" in McGill and the word "twist"—twist had previously been introduced by Lance Mountain and Neil Blender, with their invention of the "Gay twist" (a mute-grab, fakie 360-degree aerial). Inspired by the McTwist, McGill's teammate Tony Hawk invented a 720-degree aerial—a double Gay twist—and, as a homage to McGill, named it the "McHawk". The trick was groundbreaking when it was first executed and continues to be performed in the 21st century—snowboarding has also adopted the trick and Shaun White was filmed performing a double McTwist on a snowboard at the 2010 Vancouver Winter Olympics.

=== Bones Brigade ===
McGill was a member of the "Bones Brigade", an elite team of skateboarders that was sponsored by Powell Peralta, who dominated professional skateboarding (in both contests and popularity stakes) for a large part of the 1980s. Led by Stacey Peralta, the team also consisted of Lance Mountain, Tony Hawk, Rodney Mullen, Tommy Guerrero, and Steve Caballero.

McGill appeared with Peralta and other Bones Brigades members during the 2012 promotional screenings of the Peralta-directed Bones Brigade documentary, Bones Brigade: An Autobiography. The documentary premiered at the Sundance film festival and a trailer was released in January 2012.

=== Post-Bones Brigade ===
McGill mainly skated vertical, and when street skating began to dominate the industry, McGill turned to the business side of skating. He started his own skateboard company, "Chapter Seven" (which is now defunct), and opened his own skate park. As of 2012, he owns a skate shop in Encinitas, California McGills Skateshop, as well as marketing a line of beginners' skateboards, safety equipment and portable skate ramps, rails, and Air Speed skate shoes through Wal-Mart.

== Contest history ==
- 3rd in 1980 Gold Cup at Upland Skatepark: Pool
- 1st in 1981 Kona "Go For It" Contest at Jacksonville, Florida: Pool
- 2nd in 1981 Kona Summer Nationals Contest: Vert
- 4th in 1982 Rusty Harris Contest at Upland Skatepark: Pool
- 1st in 1982 Christmas Classic Contest at Upland Skatepark: Pool
- 2nd in 1983 Great Desert Ramp Battle Contest: Vert
- 4th in 1983 Spring Nationals Contest at Del Mar: Pool
- 2nd in 1983 Joe's Ramp Jam: Vert
- 5th in 1983 Kona/Variflex Summer Nationals Contest: Vert
- 5th in 1983 Summer World Series at Del Mar: Pool
- 3rd in 1983 Turkey Shoot Contest at Upland Skatepark: Pool
- 2nd in 1983 Shut Up and Skate Contest at the Clown Ramp in Dallas, Texas: Vert
- 5th in 1984 Sundek Pro/Am Skateboard Challenge at Kona Skatepark, Florida: Vert
- 2nd in 1984 NSA Summer Series at Upland Skatepark, Doubles (with Steve Steadham): Pool
- 2nd in 1984 NSA Summer Series at Del Mar: Pool
- 5th in 1984 NSA Summer Series at Del Mar: Vert
- 4th in 1985 Vision/Sims King of the Mountain Contest at Virginia Beach: Vert
- 4th in 1985 Skateboard Plus Pro/Am Contest at Little Rock, Arkansas: Vert
- 4th in 1985 Shut Up And Skate Ramp Jam at the Skatepark of Houston, Texas: Vert
- 1st in 1986 NSA Pro/Am Contest at the Skatepark of Houston, Texas: Vert
- 2nd in 1986 NSA Contest at Del Mar: Pool
- 2nd in 1986 Go Skate Sacramento Pro/Am Contest: Vert
- 3rd in 1986 East Coast Assault Contest at Virginia Beach, Mount Trashmore: Vert
- 4th in 1986 NSA Expo 86 (Vancouver, BC): Vert
- 6th in 1986 NSA Expo 86 (Vancouver, BC): Pool
- 5th in 1986 NSA Chicago Blowout Contest: Vert
- 3rd in 1986 NSA Finals Pro/Am Contest at Anaheim Convention Center: Vert
- 2nd in 1987 NSA Shut Up and Skate Contest at the Skatepark of Houston, Texas: Vert
- 1st in 1987 Raging Waters' Boomer Ramp in San Jose, Doubles (with Steve Steadham): Vert
- 6th in 1987 NSA Vision Skate Escape Contest at Los Angeles, CA: Vert
- 5t hin 1988 NSA Gotcha Grind Contest at Seattle, Washington: Vert
- 6th in 1988 Torquay Ramp Riot II at Torquay, Australia: Vert
- 3rd in 1989 NSA Vertical Championships at Hara Arena in Dayton, Ohio: Vert
- 7th in 1989 NSA Vans Jam Contest: Vert
- 8th in 1989 NSA Pro Finals at St. Pete, Florida: Vert
- 3rd in 1990 NSA Street Style Shootout Contest at Honolulu, Hawai: Highest Wallride
- 6th in 1990 NSA Pro Mini Ramp Contest at San Jose: Mini Ramp
- 6th in 1991 NSA Kona Spring Nationals at Jacksonville, Florida: Vert

All contest results are covered in Thrasher Magazine and can be checked at the magazine's archives.

== Media ==
In 2006, McGill was featured in a commercial for the Discovery Channel as the inventor of the McTwist. McGill has also teamed up with Powell Peralta and reissued his signature boards from the 1980s. He continues to skateboard.

== In popular culture ==
Along with Rodney Mullen, McGill was the stunt double for Christian Slater in Gleaming the Cube. He also had an acting role as Tommy 'D' in the 1984 Jimmy McNichol action movie Escape from El Diablo, together with fellow skateboarder Steve Caballero.

OPM's song, "Heaven Is a Halfpipe", references McGill's trick skills with the lines, "I'm gonna twist out like Mike McGill, I'm gonna twist out cos I've got the skills".

Additionally, the Beastie Boys song "B-Boys Makin with the Freak Freak" has a line alluding to McGill "Well I'm brewin' up rhymes like I was usin' a still; kickin' an old school flow like Mike McGill"
