= Powell Peralta =

American skateboard company

- Industry: Skateboarding, quad roller skates
- Predecessor: Powell Corporation (2005)
- Founded: 1978; 48 years ago
- Founder: George Powell and Stacy Peralta
- Successor: Powell Corporation (1991)
- Products: Skateboard decks, skateboard wheels, quad roller skate wheels, bearings and accessories
- Website: powell-peralta.com

Powell Peralta is an American skateboard company founded by George Powell and Stacy Peralta in 1978. The company rose to prominence in the 1980s as skateboarding began maturing as a sport. The company featured the Bones Brigade, a team featuring the era's top competitors. Peralta left the company in 1991 and Powell continued to produce skateboard equipment as Powell, Bones Bearings and RollerBones. The two company founders reunited to produce the company's now classic inventory under the name Powell Classic.

== Background ==
George Powell studied engineering at Stanford University and started making homemade skateboards in 1957. In 1974, Powell's son came and asked for a skateboard. When Powell pulled an old one out of the garage, his son complained it did not ride smoothly. Powell became interested in skateboarding again, as he realized urethane wheels improved a skateboard's ride. With this prompting, Powell started making his own skateboards and wheels. He bought urethane and baked his own wheels. He also used some new materials like aluminum and fiberglass to fabricate his own composite boards. One of the test riders of one of his flexible slalom boards was Stacy Peralta.

When Powell was laid off from his job in the aerospace industry, he moved from Los Angeles to Santa Barbara to start his own skateboard manufacturing business. In 1976, Powell built the Quiksilver ProSlalom deck which he marketed through Sims. This was followed by the Quicktail.

== Foundation of Powell Peralta ==
In 1978, Powell teamed up with Stacy Peralta forming Powell Peralta. Peralta took over team management and advertising. In 1979 they created a skateboarding team called the Bones Brigade (name unrelated to the wheels).

=== Members ===
The Bones Brigade was a skateboarding team that rode under the Powell Peralta, and later, Powell banner. Notable Bones Brigade members throughout the years have included:

- Ray "Bones" Rodriguez
- Steve Saiz
- Ray Barbee
- Steve Caballero
- Alan Gelfand
- Tommy Guerrero
- Nicky Guerrero
- Kevin Harris
- Tony Hawk
- Brandon Novak
- Bucky Lasek
- Andy Macdonald
- Guy Mariano
- Cameron Martin
- Mike McGill
- Colin McKay
- Lance Mountain
- Rodney Mullen
- Steve Rocco
- Eric Sanderson
- Chris Senn
- Jim Thiebaud
- Mike Vallely
- Danny Way
- Frankie Hill
- Per Welinder
- Ray Underhill
- Steve Steadham
- Jason Ellis

=== Filmography ===
Powell Peralta produced the Bones Brigade videos, starting in 1982, and they became some of the most influential skateboarding videos of the era:

- The Bones Brigade Video Show (1984)
- Future Primitive (1985)
- The Search for Animal Chin (1987)
- Public Domain (1988)
- Axe Rated (1988)
- Ban This (1989)
- Propaganda (1990)
- Eight (1991)
- Celebraty Tropical Fish (1991)

== Downturn and formation of Powell Corporation ==
In the late 1980s, smaller companies like World Industries appeared and took market share from the bigger companies. Powell Peralta suffered as many of their riders defected and either set up or rode for those new independent companies. At the end of 1991, Stacy Peralta left Powell Peralta and the company was then re-branded as Powell Corporation.

=== Filmography as Powell ===
- Hot Batch (1992)
- Chaos (1992)
- Play (1993)
- Suburban Diners (1994)
- Scenic Drive (1995)
- Strip Mall Heroes (1998)
- Magic (1999)
- Bones Bearings Class of 2000 (1999)
- FUN (2009)

=== Bones Bearings ===
Bones specializes in wheels. Powell continues to make skateboard products, including Bones Bearings and skateboard wheels.

== Reunion ==
Powell Peralta has re-issued decks under the brand Powell Classic. George Powell and Stacy Peralta have teamed up once again to re-issue some of the original pro models under the Powell-Peralta brand. Current reissues include models from Steve Caballero, Ray "Bones" Rodriguez, Mike McGill, Steve Steadham, and Mike Vallely. In late 2010, Powell Skateboards and Powell Classic were folded into Powell-Peralta. The current team is Pros, which includes Steve Caballero.

In March 2011 it was announced that artist VCJ (Vernon Courtlandt Johnson) has returned to Powell-Peralta, and is working on new art for the brand.

== Cultural references ==
Powell-Peralta Skateboards appeared in several films:

- The 1992 film Encino Man features Brendan Fraser's character Link riding a Lance Mountain Family (art by Lance's son) skateboard deck near the end. There is a Powell-Peralta poster clearly visible in Dave's room.
- In the teen-angst/skateboard movie Gleaming The Cube (1989) starring Christian Slater, and featuring an early cameo from Tony Hawk, the 'Crew' can be witnessed in one scene to be stickering skate transfers on public property, one or many of which are of Powell-Peralta design. Also, the main character Brian, as played by Slater, can be seen wearing some Powell-Peralta Lizard Bones Black Sweat Pants.
- Most of the Bones Brigade appeared in a skateboard sequence in Police Academy 4: Citizens on Patrol in 1987.
- In the 2009 single "Skate or Die" by Teenage Bottlerocket, the Bones Brigade was mentioned in the lyrics. "We're waging war against the poseurs of the day, If we play our cards right, Someday we might be on the Bones Brigade."
- The lead track "Hornets! Hornets!" on the Hold Steady's 2005 album Separation Sunday references Bones Brigade with the lyrics "She's got those Bones Brigade videos. She knew 'em back and forth. She slept with so many skaters."
