= Lance Mountain =

American skateboarder (born 1964)

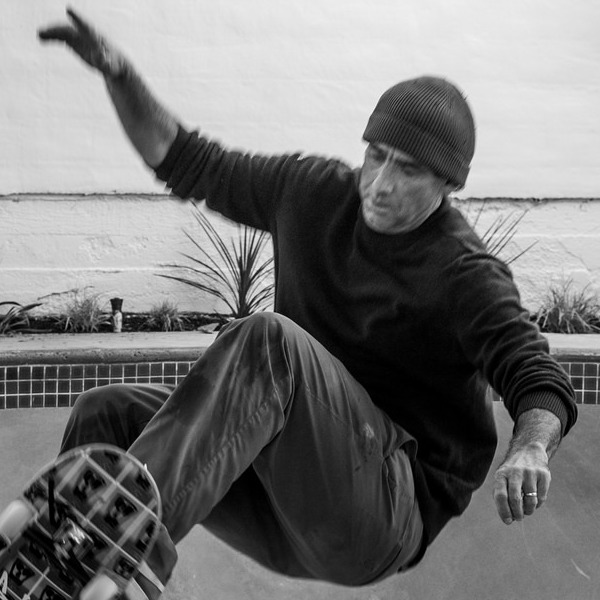
- Mountain in 2014

Personal information
- Born: Robert Lance Mountain; June 13, 1964 (age 62) Pasadena, California, U.S.
- Occupations: Skateboarder, artist
- Spouse: Yvette Loveless
- Website: lancemountain.com

Robert Lance Mountain (born June 13, 1964) is an American professional skateboarder and artist who was one of the prominent skateboarders throughout the 1980s, primarily due to his involvement with the Bones Brigade. As of August 2017, Mountain continues to skate professionally and his sponsors include Flip, Nike SB, Indy, Spitfire, and Bones Bearings.

== Professional skateboarding ==
=== Powell-Peralta to The Firm ===
Lance Mountain took first or second place in over a third of every amateur contest he participated in. Mountain's first skateboard deck sponsor was Variflex, a company that he joined in 1981; Mountain then moved to the Powell-Peralta team in the following year (1982). In a 1983 interview with John Haugh of Skater of Fortune magazine, Mountain said he left Variflex because they were "doing nothing for me or the sport as far as I'm concerned". It was during his time with Powell-Peralta that he formed a strong friendship with Stacy Peralta, the team manager and director of the Bones Brigade video series. Mountain appears in eight Bones Brigade videos, including the well-known video The Search for Animal Chin (the final video was the 1991 production Eight).

Some of Mountain's early skating influences were early titans of the sport like Steve Caballero, Darrel Miller, and Ray "Bones" Rodriguez.

Mountain gained further eminence when he won the Upland Turkey Shoot contest at Upland Skatepark in 1983, an event in which fellow team riders Steve Caballero, Mike McGill, and Tony Hawk also competed. This was followed by Mountain's 1984 appearance in skateboarding's first, full-length company video The Bones Brigade Video Show, in which Mountain filmed the segue segments for all of the "vert" (a style of skateboarding that involves skateboarding on a vertical "u"-shaped ramp) and "freestyle" (a style of skateboarding that involves technical skateboarding on flat ground) parts; the segments depict Mountain as he skateboards throughout the streets of Los Angeles, US.

In the early 1990s, the skateboard industry underwent a major transformation; the popularity of street-style skateboarding superseded that of vert skateboarding, thereby diminishing the status of the Bones Brigade while the prominence of the next wave of skaters increased. In 1991, Mountain left Powell-Peralta to cofound his own skateboard company "The Firm" and, together with former Powell-Peralta teammate Ray Barbee, recruited a team of notable skateboarders that included Bob Burnquist and Rodrigo "Tx" Teixeira.

Following the company's further development, The Firm signed a distribution deal with Blitz Distribution. Following four videos and over a decade of existence, Mountain announced the end of The Firm on March 13, 2006.

=== Flip ===
Following the demise of The Firm, several former team members were recruited by the Flip company—Mountain, Burnquist, and Teixeira (all three skateboarders appeared in the Flip full-length video Extremely Sorry (2009)). As of March 2013, Mountain and Burnquist continue to be sponsored by Flip. As a team rider for Flip, Mountain is one of the professional skateboarders featured in Tony Hawk's Proving Ground, an appearance that marked Mountain's first appearance in the Tony Hawk series of video games.

=== Sponsorship ===
As of October 2012, Mountain is sponsored by Flip, Independent Trucks, Spitfire, Nike SB (announced on May 7, 2007), and Stüssy clothing.

=== Influence ===
In Transworld SKATEboarding's "30 Most Influential Skaters Of All Time" list, Mountain was selected in the eighteenth position and Skin Phillips, the editor-in-chief of the magazine, commended Mountain for his ability to "put a smile" on the faces of skateboarders over four decades of professional skateboarding. At the time that the list was released in December 2011, Mountain stated in response: "I feel like I've influenced in the sense that if you want to do it, do it. If you don't want to do it, don't do it. But don't rely on what people are saying you can do or saying what you can't do."

== Other work ==
=== Artist ===
Mountain is a prolific artist and, as of March 2013, a catalog of his work is featured on the official Lance Mountain website, lancemountain.com. The catalog is divided into three sections: "Art Shows" (a collection of all of the art shows that Mountain has produced, with titles such as "Locals Only" and "Love & Guts"), "Art Owners" (displays photographic portraits of people who own pieces of Mountain's art), and "Random Stuff" (includes Mountain's work with items such as coffee tables, stencils, and oil paint).

In 2011, Mountain and his son contributed pieces to an art exhibition that celebrated the life of Joe Strummer, the former band member of The Clash who died in 2002. Mountain also provided graphics for a Peralta-directed television movie named When Disaster Strikes.

In July 2023, Mountain participated as a special guest artist in the Los Angeles art and music collective Surf Skate Roots Rock, reuniting with fellow skateboarding pioneers such as Tony Alva, Steve Olson, Lonnie Toft, etc.

In June 2024, Mountain organized an art and memorabilia exhibition to coincide with his 60th birthday. The exhibition was titled "Everything Must Go" and was held in Los Angeles, California. Skateboard equipment, photographs, paintings and other works produced or accumulated over the course of Mountain's career were featured.

=== Inventor ===
Mountain is often cited as one of the inventors of the fingerboard, as he fashioned the prototype out of cardboard, pencil erasers, and a disassembled Hot Wheels toy in the late 1970s. Mountain's invention was featured in a Transworld Skateboarding magazine article, as well as the Powell Peralta video, Future Primitive. The fingerboard was initially created as a fun do-it-yourself project, for which kitchen sinks were used to emulate pool riding, and has since evolved into a major toy category that has sold multiple millions of units (most prominently under the Tech Deck brand).

Together with Caballero, Mountain was the co-designer of the Independent "Stage V" skateboard truck; Mountain is also the co-inventor, with Neil Blender, of the transitional skateboard maneuver the "Gay Twist".

== Personal life ==
Mountain was born to British parents. He is a Christian. , Mountain has been married to Yvette Loveless since November 31, 1984. The couple are parents to a son, Lance, Jr.

== Contest history ==
- 2nd in 1982 Rusty Harris Pro Contest at Whittier: Pool
- 4th in 1982 Rusty Harris Pro Series Overall Results: Pool
- 1st in 1982 Summit V Open Ramp Contest at Nor-Cal: Highest Air
- 1st in 1982 Summit V Open Ramp Contest at Nor-Cal: Add-On Competition
- 3rd in 1982 Christmas Classic Contest at Upland Skatepark: Pool
- 1st in 1983 Summer World Series at Del Mar, Doubles (with Steve Caballero): Pool
- 1st in 1983 Turkey Shoot Contest at Upland Skatepark: Pool
- 3rd in 1983 St. Pete Ramp Jam: Vert
- 1st in 1984 NSA Summer Series at Upland Skatepark, Doubles (with Steve Caballero): Pool
- 4th in 1984 Massacre at Tahoe Contest: Vert
- 5th in 1985 Vision/Sims King of the Mountain Contest at Virginia Beach: Vert
- 3rd in 1985 Skateboard Plus Pro Contest at Little Rock, Arkansas: Vert
- 1st in 1985 NSA Terror in Tahoe Contest: Vert
- 5th in 1985 NSA Rap Up at the Skate Ranch at Del Mar: Pool
- 3rd in 1985 Skateboard Plus Pro Contest at Little Rock, Arkansas: Vert
- 5th in 1985 Shut Up And Skate Ramp Jam at the Skatepark of Houston, Texas: Vert
- 2nd in 1985 NSA/Variflex Rage at Badlands Contest at Upland Skatepark: Pool
- 2nd in 1986 Hot Tropics Pro Contest at Mobile, Alabama: Vert
- 4th in 1986 Go Skate Sacramento Pro Contest: Vert
- 6th in 1986 NSA Expo 86 (Vancouver, BC): Vert
- 4th in 1986 NSA Chicago Blowout Pro Contest: Vert
- 6th in 1986 NSA Bare Cover Pro Contest in Tempe, AZ: Vert
- 6th in 1986 NSA Finals Pro Contest at Anaheim Convention Center: Vert
- 5th in 1987 NSA VP Fair Pro Championship Contest at St. Louis: Vert
- 2nd in 1987 Titus World Cup Contest at Muenster, Germany: Vert
- 2nd in 1987 Titus World Cup Contest at Muenster, Germany: Street
- 6th in 1987 Thrasher Savannah Slamma I Contest: Street
- 1st in 1988 Raging Waters' Boomer Ramp Contest in San Jose, CA: Longest Stalled Invert
- 3rd in 1988 NSA Gotcha Grind Contest at Seattle, Washington: Vert
- 4th in 1988 Torquay Ramp Riot II at Torquay, Australia: Vert
- 6th in 1988 Tracker Bluegrass Aggression Session at Freedom Hall, Louisville: Street
- 5th in 1988 Titus World Cup Contest at Muenster, Germany: Vert
- 5th in 1988 Airwalk Skate Fest Contest at Toronto, Canada: Vert
- 3rd in 1988 NSA Pro Streetstyle Contest at Pride Pavilion, Phoenix St.: Street
- 4th in 1988 Capitol Burnout at the Sacramento Raceway: Mini Ramp
- 1st in 1989 Titus World Cup Contest at Muenster, Germany: Street
- 5th in 1990 Titus World Cup Contest at Muenster, Germany: Vert
- 7th in 1991 NSA Pro Finals at the Skatepark of Houston, Texas: Vert
- 7th in 1994 PSL Vert Contest in Santa Ana, California: Vert
- 9th in 1996 Pro Vert Contest at the Skatepark of Tampa, Florida: Vert
- 1st in 2016 Vans Pool Party Legends Contest, Orange, CA: Vert

All contest results are covered in Thrasher Magazine and can be checked at the Thrasher Magazine Archives.

== Filmography ==
- Thrashin' (1986)
- Police Academy 4: Citizens on Patrol (1987)
- Gleaming the Cube (1989)
- Stoked (2002)
- Lords of Dogtown (2005)
- Rom Boys: 40 Years of Rad (2020)

Mountain appears in a brief, uncredited cameo role in Lords of Dogtown, in which he appears as a "bobby" police officer in England during a scene that portrays Tony Alva filming a commercial.

== Videography ==
- Summer Sessions (1985)
- Powell Peralta: The Bones Brigade Video Show (1985)
- Powell Peralta: Future Primitive (1985)
- NSA 86' Vol. 1 (1986)
- Powell Peralta: The Search For Animal Chin (1987)
- Skateboard Superstars (1987)
- Powell Peralta: Public Domain (1988)
- Powell Peralta: Axe Rated (1988)
- Thrasher: Savannah Slamma (1988)
- Powell Peralta: Ban This (1989)
- Powell Peralta: Propaganda (1990)
- Powell Peralta: Eight (1991)
- The Firm: La Buena Vida (1992)
- Fruit Of The Vine (2000)
- 411VM: Issue 50 (2002)
- Stoked: The Rise and Fall of Gator (2002)
- Chlorine (2003)
- The Firm: Can't Stop (2003)
- Thrasher: King Of The Road 2004 (2004)
- Thrasher: Beers, Bowls & Barneys (2004)
- Thrasher: Beer Helmet (2005)
- Black Label: Who Cares? The Duane Peters Story (2005)
- Flip: Feast Tours (2006)
- Thrasher: Keg Killer (2006)
- Elwood: 1st & Hope (2006)
- Nike SB: Nothing But The Truth (2007)
- Independent: 30th Anniversary Tour (2008)
- Firsthand: Lance Mountain (2009)
- Flip: Extremely Sorry (2009)
- Nike SB: Don't Fear The Sweeper (2010)
- Bones Brigade: An Autobiography (2012)
- Poweredge: We Are Skateboarders (2012)
- Nike SB: SB Chronicles, Vol.3 (2015)
- Tony Hawk: Until the Wheels Fall Off (2022)
