= Tony Hawk =

American professional skateboarder (born 1968)

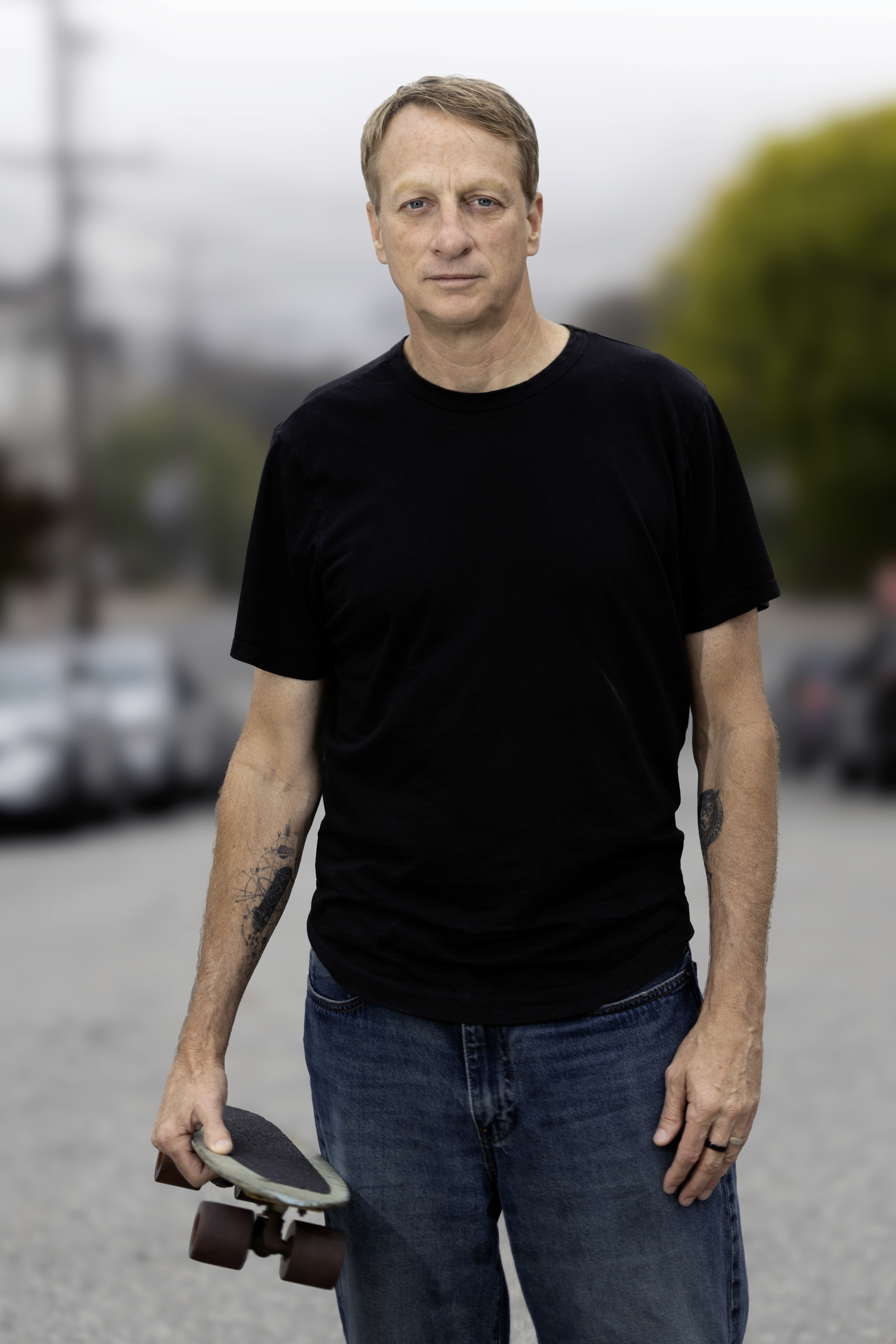
- Hawk in 2026

Personal information
- Nickname: Birdman
- Born: Anthony Frank Hawk; May 12, 1968 (age 58) San Diego, California, U.S.
- Occupations: Skateboarder, entrepreneur
- Years active: 1981–present
- Height: 6 ft 4.5 in (194 cm)
- Weight: 175 lb (79 kg)
- Spouses: Cindy Dunbar (m. 1990; div. 1993); Erin Lee (m. 1996; div. 2004); Lhotse Merriam (m. 2006; div. 2011); Catherine Goodman (m. 2015)
- Children: 4, including Riley and Spencer
- Relative: Frances Bean Cobain (daughter-in-law)
- Website: tonyhawk.com

Sport
- Country: United States
- Sport: Skateboarding
- Events: Vert skateboarding; Street skateboarding
- Turned pro: 1982
- Retired: 2003
Medal record
Summer X Games
Representing United States
Gold medal – first place	1995 Newport	Vert
Gold medal – first place	1997 San Diego	Vert
Gold medal – first place	1997 San Diego	Vert Doubles
Gold medal – first place	1998 San Diego	Vert Doubles
Gold medal – first place	1999 San Francisco	Vert Doubles
Gold medal – first place	1999 San Francisco	Vert Best Trick
Gold medal – first place	2000 San Francisco	Vert Doubles
Gold medal – first place	2001 Philadelphia	Vert Doubles
Gold medal – first place	2002 Philadelphia	Vert Doubles
Gold medal – first place	2003 Los Angeles	Vert Best Trick
Silver medal – second place	1995 Newport	Park
Silver medal – second place	1996 Newport	Vert
Silver medal – second place	2001 Philadelphia	Vert Best Trick
Bronze medal – third place	1998 San Diego	Vert
Bronze medal – third place	1999 San Francisco	Vert
Bronze medal – third place	2002 Philadelphia	Vert Best Trick
- Updated on April 23, 2013

Anthony Frank Hawk (born May 12, 1968), nicknamed Birdman, is an American professional skateboarder, entrepreneur, and the owner of the skateboard company Birdhouse. A pioneer of modern vertical skateboarding, Hawk completed the first documented "900" skateboarding trick in 1999. He also licensed a skateboarding video game series named after him, published by Activision that same year. Hawk, who retired from competing professionally in 2003, is widely regarded as one of the greatest and most influential skateboarders of all time.

Among Hawk's philanthropic activities is the Skatepark Project, which helps to build skateparks in underprivileged areas around the world.

== Early life ==
Anthony Frank Hawk was born on May 12, 1968, in San Diego, California, to Nancy (1924–2019) and Frank Hawk (1923–1995), and was raised in San Diego. He has two older sisters, Pat and Lenore, and an older brother, Steve.

As a child, Hawk was described as "hyperactive". One time, Hawk struck out in baseball and was so distraught that he hid in a ravine and had to be coaxed out by his father. His parents had him psychologically evaluated at school. The results were that Tony was "gifted", as he was tested with an IQ of 144, so school advisers recommended placing him in advanced classes. Hawk attended Jean Farb Middle School from 1980 to 1981. His parents supported his skateboarding because it served as an outlet for his restless energy. Hawk's skills developed, and he made his television debut on Captain Kangaroo as "Skateboard Johnny" in 1981. Hawk became a professional skateboarder at age 14. By age 16, he was sponsored by Powell Peralta, Tracker, Sundek, Vans, and SIO.

Hawk attended three high schools and graduated from Torrey Pines High School in 1986. He later said Steve Caballero and Christian Hosoi were his influences at the time.

== Career ==
=== Skateboarding ===
Tony Hawk is a trailblazer in vertical, or "vert", skateboarding, and remains one of the most iconic figures in the sport's history. He got his first skateboard at age nine, a gift from his older brother. Hawk then began to practice at the now-defunct Oasis Skatepark, where he started attracting attention by performing advanced maneuvers for his age. By the age of 12, he was already dominating amateur competitions across California.

Turning professional at just 14, Hawk quickly rose to the top, and signed with the Powell Peralta professional team, where he gained fame for his performances in the popular Bones Brigade videos. Hawk's first ever professional victory came at the Del Mar Freestyle Contest – Pro Pool in 1982. By 16, Hawk had won 7 competitions and was widely recognized as the best competitive skateboarder in the world. With the money he made from skateboarding, Hawk bought his first house during his senior year in high school. Throughout the late 1980s, Hawk traveled the world, skating demos and contests. By the end of the decade Hawk had 31 victories, including the TransWorld Skateboard Championships – Pro Half-Pipe (1986) and the Münster Monster Mastership Pro Half-Pipe (1989). However, by the start of the early 1990s, skateboarding had begun to develop a bad reputation, which led to Hawk falling on hard times. Despite this, Hawk continued his career, even refinancing his first house to stay financially afloat, and launched his own skateboard company, Birdhouse Projects. In the beginning Birdhouse was not making much money; however, as skateboarding surged back into popularity, the company became one of the most successful skateboarding brands, making $25 million annually within five years. As for Hawk's skateboarding career itself, by the time he reached 25 in 1993, he had won 49 contests.

1995 saw the first annual X Games, where Hawk competed in two of the events and won a gold medal in the skateboard vert with a record score of 97.50 for a “perfect run.” Additionally, he won a silver medal in the park competition. Hawk returned for the second annual X Games the following year and won a silver in vert. However, the 1997 X Games went better for Hawk, as he would double gold in both the vert and double vert events. With the success at that year's nationally televised X Games, Hawk's skateboarding brand continued to skyrocket in popularity. Hawk has credited his medal wins with "bringing the needed exposure to the sport of skateboarding." The following year, in 1998, Hawk started his own skateboarding clothing line, and at that year's X Games Hawk once again captured gold in the vert doubles and bronze in the vert. Hawk pioneered late-grab airs—which a few early grabbing pros called cheating at the time—and invented over 100 tricks, including the backside Ollie to tail, varial, frontside hurricane, rodeo flip, stalefish, and Ollie 540.

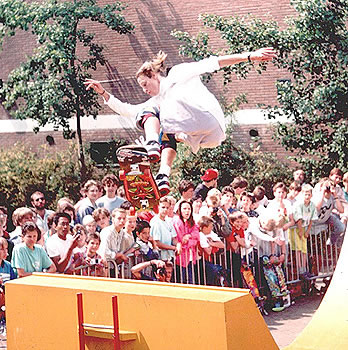
Hawk skating in 1987 (Wassenaar, Netherlands)

On June 27, 1999, at that years X Games, Hawk became the first skateboarder to land a "900", a trick involving the completion of two-and-a-half mid-air revolutions on a skateboard, in which he was successful on his twelfth attempt. After completing the trick, Hawk said, "This is the best day of my life." Hawk captured double gold at that year's events in the vertical doubles and verts best trick. He retired from professional competition that year, but Hawk continued to appear at the annual X Games, winning his 7th gold medal at the event during the vert doubles in 2000. Hawk repeated as the vert doubles winner in 2001 and took home silver in the vert best trick. In the following X games, Hawk won bronze in the vert best trick and gold in the vert doubles. Hawk's 10th and final gold medal came at the 2003 X Games, where he won the vert best trick. This would be his final X Games appearance for nearly 20 years as, following the event, he retired from performing. By the end of his career Hawk had participated in 103 professional contests, winning 73 and finishing second in 19—a staggering record that may never be matched. He also held the title of National Skateboard Association vert skating world champion for an unprecedented 12 consecutive years from 1984 to 1996.

Hawk also helped mentor skateboarder and future Olympic gold medalists snowboarder Shaun White. Hawk befriended the nine-year-old White at the Encinitas, California, YMCA skate park and mentored him, helping White turn pro in skateboarding at the age of 16.

On June 27, 2016, at age 48, Hawk performed what he claimed would be his final 900. In a video posted on the YouTube RIDE Channel, Hawk said, "Spencer was there on my first one, and now he was there on my last", after successfully landing a 900.

Hawk was invited to former US president Barack Obama's June 2009 Father's Day celebration and skated in the hallways of the nearby Old Executive Office Building on the White House grounds. This was the first time anyone had skateboarded on the White House grounds with permission from officials. In 2009, Hawk was inducted into the Skateboarding Hall of Fame at its inaugural ceremony.

As of April 2020, Hawk is sponsored by Birdhouse, Vans, Independent, Bones, and Nixon. His current Pro model shoe is the Proto. Hawk was formerly sponsored by Theeve.

In July 2021, Hawk briefly ended his competitive retirement to participate in the Vert Best Trick event at that year's X Games, finishing in fourth place out of nine competitors. Hawk's most recent competition appearances came at the 2023 X Games in California, where he finished 9th in the vert best trick and a 7th-place finish in the same event at X Games Japan.

=== Video game series ===
A video game series based on Hawk's skateboarding, titled Tony Hawk's Pro Skater, debuted in 1999. Since then, the series has spawned 18 titles so far, including ten main-series titles, four spin-offs, and four repackages.

According to former Activision CEO Bobby Kotick, Hawk was offered $300,000 for the use of his name and likeness for the original Tony Hawk's Pro Skater game, and that Hawk was living in his car due to financial issues.

Hawk's role in the series was usurped by customizable player characters in later installments, but he has remained a prominent character. In the fifth game in the series, Underground, Hawk is a minor non-player character whom the player meets in Tampa, Florida, and skates against. Impressed with the player's skills, Hawk grants them entry into a skate competition. He later appears in Moscow to teach them the "360 Varial Heelflip Lien" move. Hawk and other skaters are briefly playable near the end of the game when they skate in a promotional video for the player's skate team, and in all gameplay modes except the story mode. He appeared as a kid in the Backyard Sports game, Backyard Skateboarding.

=== Film and television ===
In 1986, Hawk was a featured skateboarder in the movie Thrashin'. In 1987, Hawk made a brief appearance in the movie Police Academy 4: Citizens on Patrol with David Spade. In 1989, Hawk appeared as a skateboarder in Gleaming the Cube. In 2002, he appeared in Neal H. Moritz's and Christopher Gilcrest's film xXx playing the role of one of Xander Cage's stuntman friends. In 2004, Hawk played himself in the Australian skateboarding movie Deck Dogz. In 2006, he made a cameo appearance in the film Drake & Josh Go Hollywood as himself. Hawk also had a cameo in the movie The New Guy, and appeared in Jackass: The Movie, skateboarding in a fat suit with Mat Hoffman and Bam Margera, as well as in Jackass Number Two skateboarding through an obstacle course. Hawk also appeared in the opening title sequences in Jackass 3D and Jackass Forever. He appeared in the film following the 2006 Gumball Rally, 3000 Miles, again with Bam Margera. Hawk also played the police officer who arrests Ryan Dunn in the movie Haggard: The Movie. Hawk made a brief cameo appearance in Lords of Dogtown as an astronaut, where he is shown comically falling off the skateboard as he is a "rookie". Hawk voiced himself in the 2006 animated movie Tony Hawk in Boom Boom Sabotage, where he is kidnapped by circus freaks.

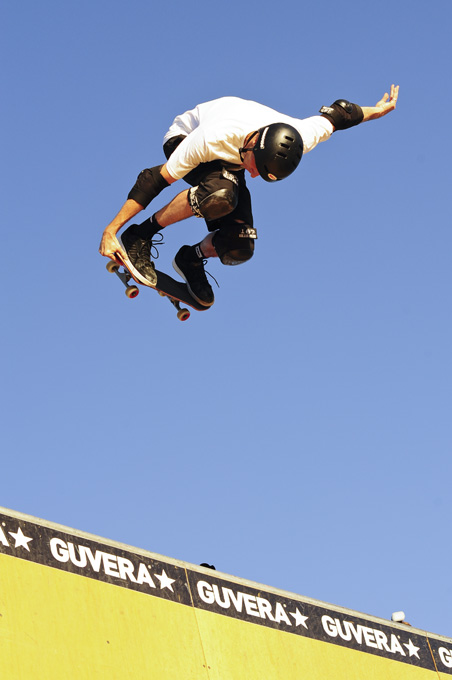
Hawk doing skate jam in 2012

Hawk was featured as an extra in the "Weird Al" Yankovic music video "Smells Like Nirvana". He can be seen sitting in the bleachers during the crowd sweep near Dick Van Patten. Hawk also made a cameo appearance in the Simple Plan music video for "I'm Just a Kid", he can be seen, in a crowd, at a high school, watching kids skating.

On television, Hawk was a guest on the Nickelodeon kid's show Yo Gabba Gabba!. In 2001, he played himself in Max Steel. Hawk also guest voiced on The Simpsons episode "Barting Over", where he played himself, along with fellow San Diegans Blink-182. In the episode, Hawk lends Homer a new board from his brand where complete rookies are able to perform at the top levels. Hawk ends up having a comical play off with him after Homer begins to show him up. Tony Hawk appeared as himself in MXC in a special "MXC Almost Live" episode in 2004. On the PBS Kids show Cyberchase, Hawk guest-starred as Slider's long-lost father Coop. In the CSI: Miami episode "Game Over" he played a game programmer who was murdered. Hawk also played on Fox's Are You Smarter Than a 5th Grader?. Hawk hosted Cartoon Network's "Hall of Game" sports award show on February 25, 2011. Hawk was on Take Two With Phineas and Ferb. Hawk appeared on the internet cooking show Epic Meal Time on October 18, 2011, to celebrate the show's one-year anniversary, where he can be seen in the final scene eating a deep-fried pizza cake. Hawk reappeared on another Epic Meal Time video on July 20, 2013, as a guest on the educational cooking show Handle It. Hawk assisted Harley Morenstein (Sauce Boss) in cooking egg rolls. The video features promotion for Hawk's own YouTube channel, RIDE Channel. He also guest-starred on the ABC comedy Last Man Standing. He played himself in an episode of Rocket Power.

Hawk appeared in the TV series Breaking In, The High Fructose Adventures of Annoying Orange, The Cleveland Show, Sesame Street, and So Random!. Hawk appeared in the movie Parental Guidance as himself. In 2013, he and Eric Koston appeared as reporters in an episode of The Aquabats! Super Show!, another series by Yo Gabba Gabba! creator and longtime friend of Hawk's, Christian Jacobs. He also appeared in Disney's Zeke and Luther as himself. In 2015, Hawk acted as a stunt double for Will Ferrell during a skateboarding scene in the film Daddy's Home. Hawk sustained an injury that required 10 stitches in his leg while filming the scene.

In 2020, Hawk competed in season three of The Masked Singer as "Elephant". He was the first of Group B to be eliminated.

In 2022, Hawk did a guest voice role in The Casagrandes episode "Skaters Gonna Hate" where it was revealed that he had a history with Carlos Casagrande back when he operated as "Carlos X". That same year, HBO released a documentary on him titled Tony Hawk: Until the Wheels Fall Off. Hawk worked with Laughing Dragon Studios to develop the animated series Skatebirds. Hawk also served as a presenter at the 94th annual academy awards in March 2022.

On March 27, 2024, Hawk made an appearance on AEW Dynamite in a pre-taped segment with Darby Allin. In 2025 Hawk appeared as a special guest in an episode of The Tiny Chef Show, along with doing a guest appearance in the Big City Greens episode "Locked in/City Wayne" voicing the character Jagger.

=== Other ventures ===
Hawk hosted a weekly radio show on SiriusXM from 2004 to 2019 called "Tony Hawk's Demolition Radio". In 2021, Hawk partnered with fellow skateboarder and former SiriusXM host Jason Ellis for the weekly podcast "Hawk vs. Wolf".

In 2002, Hawk started a show tour featuring freestyle motocross, skateboarding, and BMX. It started in Las Vegas and went on to 31 cities around the U.S. and eventually to Six Flags amusement parks.

A series of amusement park rides known as Tony Hawk's Big Spin were built in three Six Flags parks in 2007 and 2008. The ride was originally billed as the "Tony Hawk experience" and was designed to have the look and feel of a giant red-and-black skatepark. It offered a full "extreme sports" experience, with monitors in the queue lines displaying highlights of the history of action sports and a large spinning Tony Hawk figure crowning the ride. In 2010, Six Flags cancelled its license and the rides were renamed to Pandemonium. The ride at Six Flags Discovery Kingdom was moved to Six Flags Mexico in 2012. Additionally, a water park ride called Tony Hawk's Half pipe (renamed The Half pipe in 2011) was opened at Six Flags America in Bowie, Maryland.

In February 2018, New York magazine reported that Hawk was working with Jeremy Burge to help design Emojipedia's skateboard emoji after the company's initial design was criticized by Hawk as "a skateboard you would buy at a department store in the '80s." The updated design was based on Hawk's own skateboard. Subsequent releases of the skateboard emoji from Apple and Samsung resemble Hawk's board (including 60mm wheels) despite no direct collaboration between Hawk and these companies.

In 2021 Hawk founded the Vert Alert, a dedicated vertical skateboarding competition in Salt Lake City, partnering with the Utah Sports Commission and Vans for a free two-day event including pro contests, amateur qualifiers, and a legends demo with skateboarders such as Steve Caballero and Andy Macdonald.

In 2022, Hawk signed a contract with Cleopatra Records, and released his first single, a cover of The Jam's "In the City", featuring punk rock supergroup Punk Rock Karaoke. The single was released on July 22, 2022, with its B-side, a cover of The Damned's "Neat Neat Neat". In 2023, Hawk joined Goldfinger on stage and sang "Superman" during their performances at House of Blues and at the When We Were Young Festival. He also performed "Superman" and a cover of Agent Orange's "Bloodstains" with Australian band Birdman, during his tour An Evening with Tony Hawk across Australia in January 2024.

In 2025, Hawk opened Chick & Hawk in Encinitas, CA. Chick & Hawk is a chicken sandwich restaurant that pays homage to skate culture.

In May 2026, it was announced that Hawk is one of the primary investors in an upcoming MMA promotion run by promoter Scott Coker.

== Contest victories ==
No.	Year	Contest	Ref.
1	1982	Del Mar Freestyle Contest – Pro Pool	
2	1983	Del Mar Spring Nationals – Pool	
3	1983	Summer World Series Finals, Del Mar – Pool	
4	1984	Sundek Pro-Am Skateboard Challenge – Half-Pipe	
5	1984	Booney Ramp Eagle Rock Contest – Pro	
6	1984	NSA Finals – Pro Half-Pipe	
7	1984	NSA Finals – Pro Pool	
8	1985	NSA Spring Fling, Del Mar – Pro Pool	
9	1985	NSA No. 3 Pro Contest – Pool	
10	1985	NSA/Variflex Rage – Pro Combi-Pool	
11	1985	Vision/Sims King of the Mountain Contest – Vert	
12	1985	Skateboard Plus Pro-Am Contest – Pro Vert	
13	1985	Shut Up And Skate Ramp Jam – Vert	
14	1986	TransWorld Skateboard Championships – Pro Half-Pipe	
15	1986	Southern Fried Shred Pro-Am – Pro	
16	1986	Hot Tropics Pro Contest – Vert	
17	1986	NSA Contest, Del Mar – Pool	
18	1986	NSA Expo 86 (Vancouver) – Vert	
19	1986	NSA Chicago Blowout Pro Contest – Vert	
20	1986	NSA Bare Cover Pro Contest – Vert	
21	1987	NSA Ramp N' Rage Down South Contest – Vert	
22	1987	NSA Skatewave International Professional Championships – Vert	
23	1987	NSA VP Fair Pro Championship Contest – Vert	
24	1988	Airwalk Skate Fest Contest – Vert	
25	1988	NSA Gotcha Grind Contest – Vert	
26	1988	Capitol Burnout – Mini Ramp	
27	1988	Torquay Ramp Riot II – Vert	
28	1989	NSA Vertical Championships – Vert	
29	1989	NSA Pro Finals – Street	
30	1989	NSA Pro Finals – Vert	
31	1989	Münster Monster Mastership – Pro Half-Pipe	
32	1990	Del Mar Fairgrounds – Vert	
33	1990	Del Mar Fairgrounds – Street	
34	1990	NSA Back to the City Contest – Street	
35	1990	NSA Wheels for Wishes Contest – Vert	
36	1991	NSA Pow Wow Street Style Contest – Street	
37	1991	NSA Kona Spring Nationals – Vert	
38	1991	NSA Capitol Burnout Contest – Vert	
39	1991	Holy Masters Skate Contest – Vert	
40	1991	NSA Pro Finals – Vert	
41	1991	Münster Monster Mastership – Pro Half-Pipe	
42	1991	Münster Monster Mastership – Street style	
43	1992	NSA Kona Pro Contest – Mini Ramp	
44	1992	NSA Spring Fling Contest – Street	
45	1992	Mini and Vert Pro Contest – Vert	
46	1992	Mini and Vert Pro Contest – Street	
47	1992	Mini and Vert Pro Contest – Mini Ramp	
48	1993	World Championship – Vert	
49	1993	Münster Monster Mastership – Pro Half-Pipe	
50	1995	X Games – Vert	
51	1995	Hard Rock Café & Vans World Championships – Vert	
52	1996	Hard Rock Triple Crown of Skateboarding Contest – Vert	
53	1997	Hard Rock Triple Crown of Skateboarding Contest – Vert	
54	1997	X Games – Vert	
55	1997	X Games – Vert Doubles	
56	1997	Hard Rock Café & Vans World Championships – Vert Doubles	
57	1998	Sean Miller Memorial SPOT Pro Contest – Vert	
58	1998	X Games – Vert Doubles	
59	1998	Woodward Skatecamp Contest – Vert	
60	1998	Woodward Skatecamp Contest – Street	
61	1998	Goodwill Games – Pro Street Doubles	
62	1998	Vans Triple Crown of Skateboarding Contest – Vert	
63	1998	Hard Rock Café & Vans World Championships – Best Trick	
64	1998	Münster Monster Mastership – Pro Half-Pipe	
65	1999	X Trials Pro Contest – Vert	
66	1999	X Games – Vert Doubles	
67	1999	X Games – Vert Best Trick	
68	1999	Vans Triple Crown of Skateboarding Finals – Vert	
69	1999	MTV Sports and Music Festival – Best Trick	
70	2000	X Games – Vert Doubles	
71	2001	X Games – Vert Doubles	
72	2002	X Games – Vert Doubles	
73	2003	X Games – Vert Best Trick	
All contest results are covered in Thrasher magazine and can be checked in its archives.

== Tricks invented ==
Hawk has invented 89 Skateboarding tricks:

- 720
- 900
- 360 flip mute to fakie
- 360 frontside rock 'n' roll
- 360 ollie to backside boardslide
- 360 varial disaster
- 360 varial McTwist
- 360 varial to tail
- 540 body varial
- Airwalk
- Airwalk to fakie
- Alley-oop backside bluntslide
- Backside heelflip body varial
- Backside ollie one foot
- Backside ollie to tail
- Backside pop shove-it
- Backside rewind grind
- Backside varial
- Bluntslide to fakie
- Cab backside smith
- Cab body varial
- Cab lipslide
- Cab revert
- Cab shove-it
- Cab to tail
- Double kickflip varial indy
- Eggplant to fakie
- Fakie heelflip varial lien
- Fakie to fakie 540
- Fakie to fakie frontside rock 'n' roll
- Fakie to fakie lien 540
- Fakie to fakie stalefish 540
- Fingerflip air to fakie
- Fingerflip backside air
- Frontside 270 to switch crook
- Frontside bluntslide
- Frontside body varial revert
- Frontside cab
- Frontside cab disaster
- Frontside cab disaster revert
- Frontside cab revert
- Frontside cab tailgrab
- Frontside G twist
- Frontside G twist body varial
- Frontside G twist madonna
- Frontside G twist varial
- Frontside hurricane
- Frontside hurricane to fakie
- Frontside kickflip body varial
- Frontside L twist to tail
- Frontside nosegrind
- Frontside noseslide
- G twist 360 varial
- G twist heelflip body varial
- G twist varial disaster revert
- Gymnast plant
- Half cab body varial lien
- Half cab frontside blunt revert
- Half cab to bluntslide
- Half elguerial
- Heelflip slob air
- Heelflip varial lien
- Heelflip varial lien revert
- Indy 540
- Invert to layback air
- Kickflip McTwist
- Lipslide revert
- Madonna
- Nollie heelflip indy
- Ollie 540
- Ollie to indy air
- Rodeo flip
- Sacktap
- Saran wrap
- Shove-it frontside nosegrind
- Shove-it rock 'n' roll
- Shove-it to backside smith
- Slob G Twist one foot
- Stalefish
- Stalefish 540
- Stalefish frontside 540
- Switch 540
- Switch backside ollie
- Switch indie air
- Switcheroo to fakie
- Tailgrab one foot 540
- Varial 540
- Varial 720
- Varial G twist

== Awards and honors ==
All contest victories and X Games medals can be found above.

=== Notable skateboarding achievements ===
12× Consecutive National Skateboarding Association Vert Champion: 1983–1995

- 16× X Games Medalist
  - 10× X Games Gold Medalist
    - 2× Vert Gold Medal: 1995, 1997
    - 6× Vert Doubles Gold Medal: 1997, 1998, 1999, 2000, 2001, 2002
    - 2× Vert Best Trick Gold Medal: 1999, 2003
  - 3× X Games Silver Medalist
    - Park Silver Medal: 1995
    - Vert Silver Medal: 1996
    - Vert Best Trick Silver Medal: 2001
  - 3× X Games Bronze Medalist
    - 2× Vert Bronze Medal: 1998, 1999
    - Vert Best Trick Bronze Medal: 2002
- 7× Münster Monster Mastership Medalist
  - 5× Münster Monster Mastership Gold Medal
    - 4× Pro Half-Pipe Gold Medal: 1989, 1991, 1993, 1998
    - Street Style Gold Medal: 1991
  - 2× Münster Monster Mastership Streetstyle Pro Silver Medal: 1989, 1993
- 5× Hard Rock Cafe and Vans World Champion
  - 3× Vert: 1995, 1996, 1997
  - Vert Doubles: 1997
  - Best Trick: 1998
- World Championships at Antwerp, Belgium – Vert World Champion: 1993
- 2× Hard Rock Triple Crown of Skateboarding – Vert Champion: 1996, 1997
- 2× Vans Triple Crown of Skateboarding Vert Champion: 1998, 1999
- TransWorld Skateboard Championships – Pro Half-Pipe Champion: 1986
- Del Mar Spring Nationals – Pool Champion: 1983
- Summer World Series Finals at Del Mar – Pool Champion: 1983
- 24× National Skateboarding Association Contest Champion: 1983–1992

=== Media awards ===
- Inaugural Thrasher Skater of the Year: 1990
- TransWorld Skateboarding Awards
  - 4× Best Vert Skater: 1998, 1999, 2000, 2001
    - Runner-Up: 2002
  - Legend Award: 2008
- Alternative Athlete of the Year ESPY Award: 2000
- Laureus World Sports Award for Action Sportsperson of the Year Inaugural Nominee: 2000
- ESPN Action Sports Achievement Award: 2001
- 5× Nickelodeon Kids' Choice Awards Favorite Male Athlete: 2001, 2003, 2004, 2005, 2008
- Young Hollywood Awards – Cultural Icon Award: 2002
- Make-A-Wish Foundation Favorite Male Athlete: 2002
- Laureus World Sports Academy Member & Ambassador: 2003
- Teen Choice Awards
  - Male Athlete of the Year: 2004
    - 2× Nominee: 2002, 2003
  - Extreme Athlete of the Year: 2001
  - Extreme Male Athlete of the Year: 2000
    - Nominee: 1999
- Muhammad Ali Celebrity Fight Night XII – Entrepreneur of the Year Award: 2006
- X-Dance Athlete of the Year: 2008
- STOKED Awards – Achievement Award: 2008
- Kids for Peace – Peace Hero Award: 2009
- James Joyce Award: 2009
- United States Sports Academy – Distinguished Service Award: 2009
- RWJF Steve Patterson Award – The Tony Hawk Foundation: 2013
- WORLDZ Summit – Titan Award: 2016
- Clio Sports Awards Lifetime Achievement Award: 2019
- Vital Voices – Voices of Solidarity Award: 2023
- San Diego Sports Medicine Foundation – Taste at the Cove Fundraiser – Community Legend Honoree

=== Video game awards ===
- 2× Game Informer Game of the Year: 1999, 2000
- Academy of Interactive Arts & Sciences D.I.C.E. Awards – Tony Hawk's Video Games
  - 2× Console Game of the Year Nominee: 1999, 2000
  - Console Sports Game of the Year: 2001
    - 3× Nominee: 1999, 2000, 2002
  - Game of the Year Nominee: 2000
  - Outstanding Achievement in Gameplay Engineering Nominee: 2000
  - 2× Outstanding Achievement in Game Design Nominee: 2000, 2003
  - Hand-Held Mobile Game of the Year Nominee: 2001
  - Outstanding Achievement in Visual Engineering Nominee: 2001
  - Outstanding Achievement in Animation Nominee: 2001
  - 2× Outstanding Achievement in Soundtrack Nominee: 2003, 2004
  - Console Action Sports Game of the Year: 2004
    - Nominee: 2003
  - 2× Sports Game of the Year: 2006, 2020
- Blockbuster Entertainment Awards
  - 2× Favorite PlayStation Game: 2000, 2001
  - Favorite Dreamcast Game: 2001
  - Favorite Game Boy Game: 2001
- Electronic Gaming Monthly Game of the Year: 2000
- BAFTA Interactive Entertainment Awards Hand-Held Game of the Year: 2001
- Nickelodeon Kids' Choice Awards Video Game of the Year: 2001
- VSDA/EMA Awards
  - Video Game of the Year: 2001
  - GameCube Video Game of the Year: 2002
  - 2× Xbox Video Game of the Year: 2002, 2004
- Teen Choice Awards Video Game of the Year Nominee: 2003
- Spike Video Game Awards
  - Best Sports Game: 2003
    - Nominee: 2004
  - Best Music Nominee: 2003
  - Game of the Year Nominee: 2003
  - Best Song in a Video Game Nominee: 2004
  - 2× Best Individual Sports Game: 2005, 2006
    - Nominee: 2007
  - 2× Best Soundtrack Nominee: 2005, 2007
- MTV Video Music Award for Best Video Game Soundtrack: 2004
  - Nominee: 2005

=== Halls of fame ===
- Breitbard Hall of Fame Class of 2002
- Skateboarding Hall of Fame Class of 2009 – Inaugural Inductee
- California Hall of Fame Class of 2019
- Shacknews Hall of Fame Class of 2024 – Tony Hawk's Pro Skater
- Münster Monster Mastership Hall of Fame

== Image and legacy ==
Hawk speaking about the importance of skateboarding in people's lives at the California Hall of Fame induction ceremony in 2019

In December 2011, Hawk was listed by Transworld Skateboarding magazine as the second-most-influential skateboarder of all time, particularly for the invention of the backside ollie to tail.

In January 2013, professional skateboarder John Cardiel, ranked by Transworld Skateboarding as the eleventh most influential skateboarder of all time, listed Hawk as one of his most important influences, as well as Mark Gonzales and Christian Hosoi. Cardiel explained, "... the insane 540s with no hands, and, just like, all his tricks; he had the ramps, all his ramps, all the ramps he had—I thought that was insane. Tony Hawk's the best." The California Museum's official biography on Hawk reads "Tony Hawk is a pioneer of vertical, or vert, skateboarding and one of the most famous skateboarders in the sport’s history."

In an interview for the online series Free Lunch, produced by Hawk's RIDE Channel, professional skateboarder Andrew Reynolds said:

Tony Hawk—he's like, basically, to me it says, "You can be a skater and take over everything and be, you know ... and use skateboarding to be a businessman, a role model to young people," um, he's just the best. And, he called my house when I was fifteen, and was, like, "Do you wanna do something with us?" not knowing anything about me.

In 2012, Reynolds recruited Hawk's son Riley, who was 19 years old at the time, for Reynolds' skateboard deck company, Baker.

Hawk often posts on Twitter about encounters he has with people who do not recognize him or wonder if he is truly Tony Hawk. Various publications have speculated about Hawk's motivation:

The cynical among us might argue that as he slides inexorably out of cultural relevancy, Tony Hawk desperately needs to remind us that he's still here, still famous. Others might say he's trying to communicate that he's fed up with it all, his stream of tweets a not-so-subtle hint... But no. Tony Hawk... thinks it is the funniest thing in the world, and he will keep thinking it is the funniest thing in the world, and keep tweeting about it, for the rest of his life.

== Personal life ==
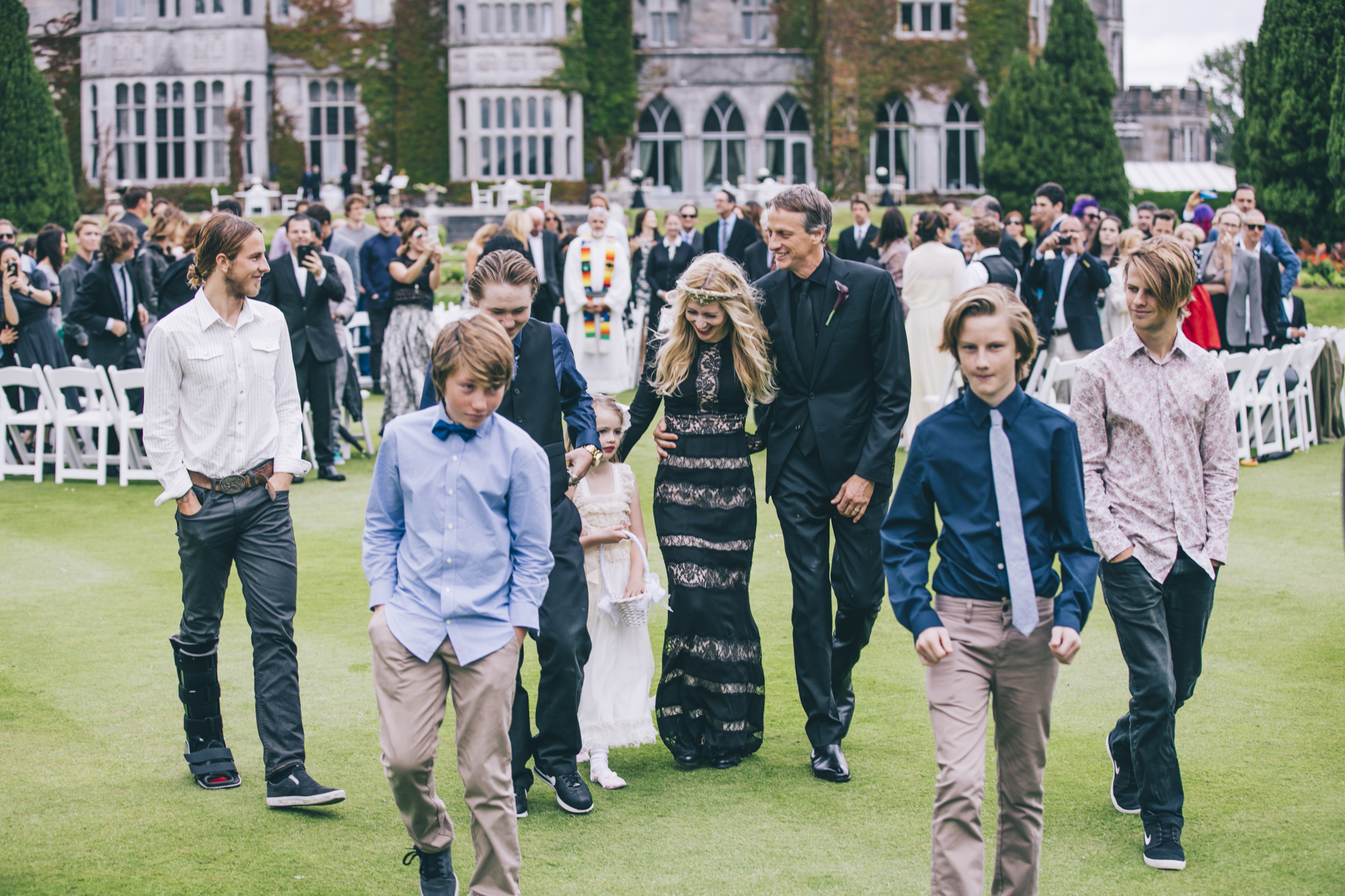
Hawk and his wife Catherine at their wedding in 2015

=== Relationships ===
In April 1990, Hawk married Cindy Dunbar, whom he began dating in high school. Their son, Riley Hawk, was born on December 6, 1992, and was named after one of Hawk's ancestors. Riley is also a professional skateboarder. Hawk and Dunbar divorced in 1993. Riley is married to Frances Bean Cobain, daughter of musicians Courtney Love and the late Kurt Cobain. They have a son together, Hawk's first grandchild.

Hawk was married to Erin Lee from 1996 to 2004. They have two children, Spencer (born in 1999) and Keegan (born in 2001). Spencer is an electronic music producer who releases music as Gupi.

Hawk was married to Lhotse Merriam from 2006 to 2011. Their wedding was held in Fiji and Rancid played for them as the wedding band. The couple's daughter Kadence was born in 2008.

Hawk married his fourth wife, Cathy Goodman, on June 27, 2015, in a ceremony in Limerick, Ireland.

=== Interests ===
Hawk purchased a camcorder in Japan and had a friend translate the controls for him, and an Amiga 2000 in the late 1980s. NewTek sent him a Video Toaster for his Amiga in exchange for appearing in a promotional video alongside Wil Wheaton and Penn Jillette, which he later used for editing a promotional video for the TurboDuo game Lords of Thunder in 1993. In 2012, Hawk decided to invest money into digital currency, Bitcoin. His "fun project" became a big source of income and interest for him. Hawk is a supporter of the San Diego Padres baseball team, and on October 2, 2024, he threw out the ceremonial first pitch prior to one of their games. Hawk's musical interest include punk and ska with some of his favorite bands including DEVO, Frank Black, The Clash, Nine Inch Nails and Dead Kennedys. He also enjoys snowboarding.

=== Philanthropy ===
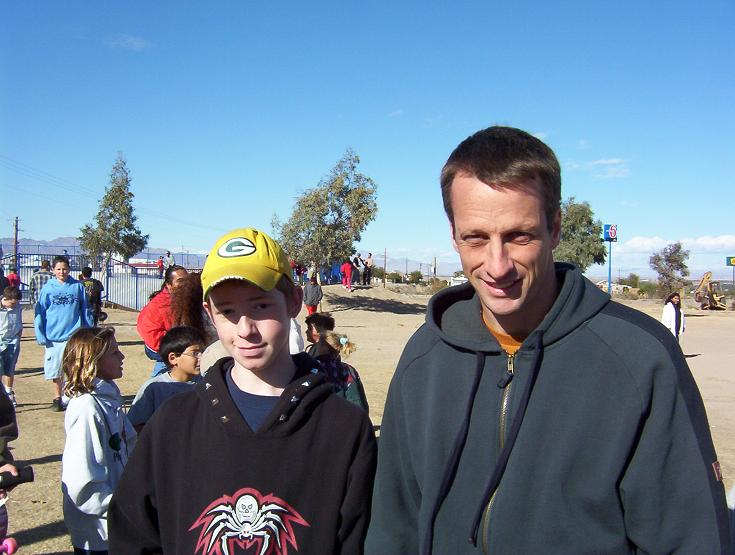
Hawk at the opening of the Needles Skate Park in Needles, California, in 2004. Hawk donated $10,000 to the building of the park and made an appearance at the grand opening.

Hawk created the Tony Hawk Foundation in 2002 in response to the lack of safe and legal skateparks in America. As of June 2018, his foundation has awarded US$5.8 million, aiding 596 skatepark projects. In 2015, the foundation received the Robert Wood Johnson Sports award, which honors recipients for their innovative and influential approaches to using sports to build a culture of health in their communities. In 2007, Hawk, Andre Agassi, Muhammad Ali, Lance Armstrong, Warrick Dunn, Jeff Gordon, Mia Hamm, Andrea Jaeger, Jackie Joyner-Kersee, Mario Lemieux, Alonzo Mourning, and Cal Ripken Jr. founded the charity Athletes for Hope, an organization that aims to inspire all people to volunteer and support their communities through the actions of professional athletes. In 2020, the Tony Hawk Foundation changed its name to The Skatepark Project to better describe the organization's mission. Since its inception The Skatepark Project, has funded over 660 public skatepark constructions across all 50 U.S. states with more than $13 million in grants.

In March 2022, an HBO documentary about Hawk raised money for humanitarian relief in Ukraine by raffling off access to an advance screening and afterparty. Half of the proceeds were donated to Direct Relief.

In 2023, Hawk auctioned a signed photograph of himself and Rick Thorne, with 50% of the proceeds to be donated to the Tyre Nichols Memorial Fund. The fund was created following the death of Tyre Nichols at the hands of law enforcement officers. One of the fund's plans involve building a skate park in Nichols' honor.

== Filmography ==
=== Films ===
Year	Title	Role/Notes	Ref.
1986	Thrashin'	Skating competitor	
1987	Police Academy 4	Skateboarder extra	
1987	The Search for Animal Chin	Himself	
1989	Gleaming the Cube	Member of Brian's skate crew	
1989	Ban This	Himself	
1996	Escape from L.A.	Surfing stunt double for Peter Fonda in the tsunami wave scene filmed on a Wave Loch sheet wave in Texas.	
1997	Arnette: My Way	Himself	
1998 (Note: re-released in 2001.)	The End	Himself	
2001	Max Keeble's Big Move	Himself	
2002	The New Guy	Himself (cameo)	
2002	Stoked: The Rise and Fall of Gator		
2002	XXX	Cameo	
2002	Jackass: The Movie	Himself	
2003	Haggard: The Movie	Cop	
2005	Lords of Dogtown	Astronaut (cameo)	
2005	Tony Hawk's HuckJam Diaries	Himself	
2005	Deck Dogz	Himself	
2005	Black Label: Who Cares? The Duane Peters Story		
2005	The Reality of Bob Burnquist	Himself	
2006	Drake & Josh Go Hollywood	Himself	
2006	Jackass Number Two	Himself	
2006	Tony Hawk in Boom Boom Sabotage	Himself (voice)	
2006	3000 Miles	Himself	
2010	Jackass 3D	Himself	
2011	The Other F Word		
2012	Waiting for Lightning		
2012	Bones Brigade: An Autobiography		
2012	Parental Guidance		
2013	Bonus Brigade		
2014	Unity	Narrator (documentary)	
2015	Daddy's Home	Skateboarding stunt double	
2017	Sharknado 5: Global Swarming	The Hawk	
2021	Humanity Stoked	Himself (documentary)	
2022	Jackass Forever	Himself	
2022	Tony Hawk: Until the Wheels Fall Off	Himself	
2022	Jackass 4.5	Himself	
2023	Glory of the Seat: the Chair Olympics Story	Himself	
2024	The Real Bros of Simi Valley: The Movie	Hawk Sanders	

=== Television ===
Year	Title	Role/Notes	Ref.
2000	The Jersey	Himself (episode "The Girlfriend", along with Dave Mirra)	
2000–2001	Jackass	Himself (3 episodes)	
2001	Rocket Power	Himself (voice, episode "Enter the Hawk-Trix")	
2001	Max Steel	Himself (voice, episode "Extreme")	
2002	What I Like About You	Himself (Pilot episode)	
2003	The Simpsons	Himself (voice, episode "Barting Over")	
2004	MXC	Geek Team Leader/Himself	
2005	Cyberchase	Coop (voice, episode "Measure For Measure")	
2005	CSI: Miami	Season 3 episode 18 (Skateboarder/game tester/game programmer/victim)	
2007	Yo Gabba Gabba!	Himself (episode "Move")	
2007	Are You Smarter than a 5th Grader?	Himself – Contestant	
2008	The Suite Life of Zack & Cody	Himself	
2009	Sesame Street	Himself (episode #4191, "Abby Makes Seasons Change")	
2010, 2012	Zeke and Luther	Himself (two episodes)	
2011	Hall of Game Awards	Host	
2011	Take Two with Phineas and Ferb	Himself (episode "Tony Hawk")	
2011	So Random!	Himself	
2011	Epic Meal Time	Himself (episode "Fast Food Pizza Cake")	
2011	The Cleveland Show	Himself (voice, episode "Back to Cool")	
2011	Kick Buttowski: Suburban Daredevil	Hush (voice)	
2012	Last Man Standing	Himself (episode "Moon Over Kenya")	
2012	Breaking In	Himself (episode "Heatherses")	
2013	Epic Meal Time: Handle It	Himself (episode "Steak Bacon 'N Cheese Eggroll")	
2013	The High Fructose Adventures of Annoying Orange	Ripe Rind (voice, episode "Fast and Fruitious")	
2013	The Aquabats! Super Show!	Journalist (episode "Return of the Aquabats!")	
2013, 2022	Hell's Kitchen	Himself	
2014	Comedy Bang! Bang!		
2014	Video Game High School		
2015	Gaming Show (In My Parents' Garage)		
2016	The Eric Andre Show		
2017	Skylanders Academy	Flame	
2017	Trailer Park Boys: Out of the Park USA		
2017	Whose Line Is It, Anyway?		
2018	The Super Slow Show		
2018	Ballers	Himself (episode "Forgiving is Living")	
2019	The Burger Show		
2020	The Masked Singer	Elephant	
2020	Nickelodeon's Unfiltered	Himself	
2020	Game Changer	Himself (episode "Tell Us About Yourself")	
2020	Group Chat	Himself	
2021	Celebrity Wheel of Fortune	Himself	
2022	The Casagrandes	Himself	
2022	Middlemost Post	Hawkman	
2023	The Really Loud House	Himself	
2023	Saturday Night Live	Himself	
2023	Canada's Got Talent	Himself	
2024	AEW Dynamite	Himself (March 27 episode)	
2024	Loot	Himself (episode "Space for Everyone")	
2025	The Tiny Chef Show	Guest star (episode "Spicy Cauliflower Bites")	
2025	Big City Greens	Jagger/Allen (voice, episode "Locked In")	
TBA	Skatebirds	Developer	

=== Videos ===
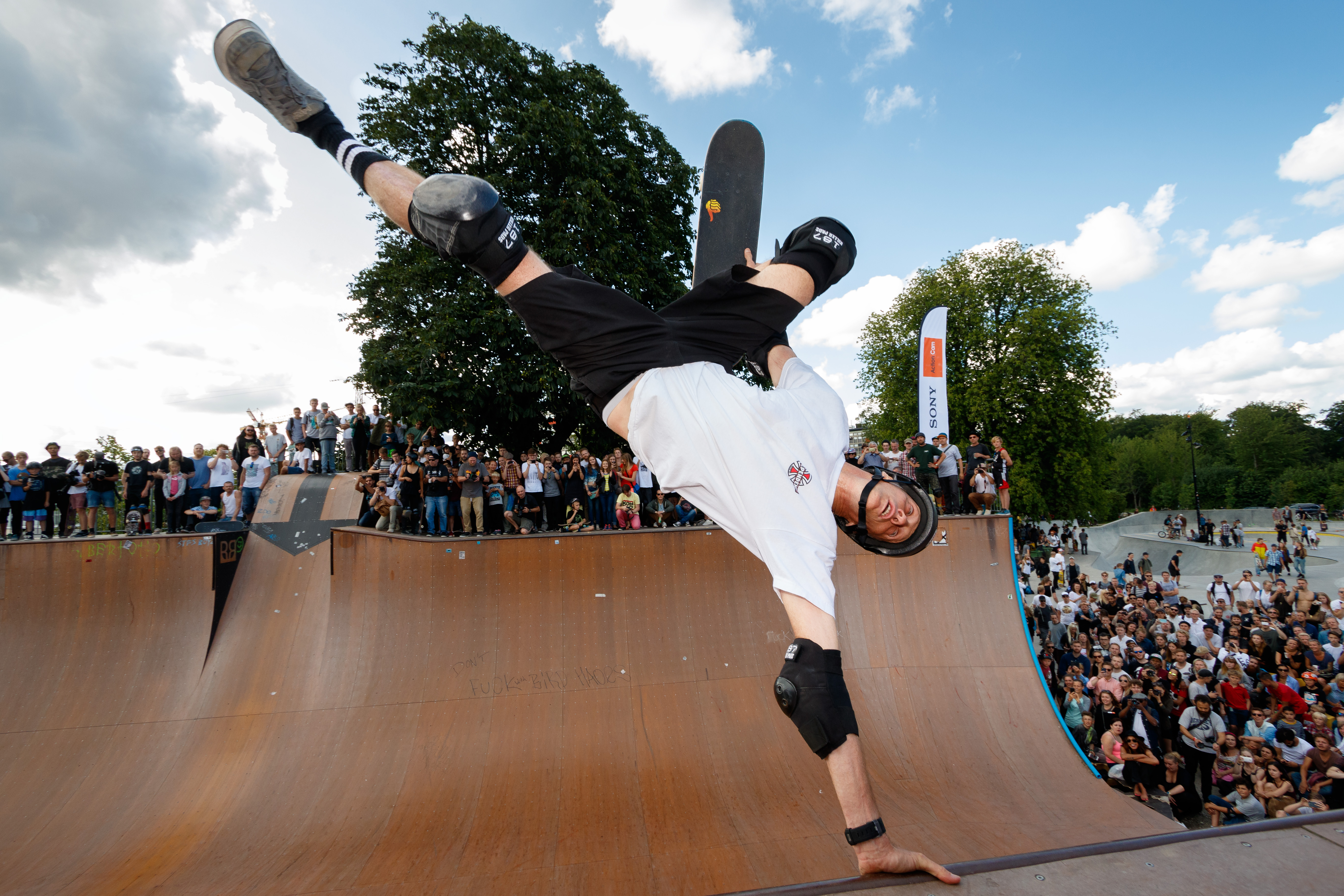
Hawk in 2015

Year	Title	Ref.
1982	Powell Peralta: Skateboarding in the 80s	
1984	Powell Peralta: The Bones Brigade Video Show	
1985	Sure-Grip: Summer Sessions	
1985	Powell Peralta: Future Primitive	
1986	NSA 86' Vol. 1: Southwest Regional Championships	
1987	NSI: On the Prowl	
1988	Vision: Psycho Skate	
1988	NSI: Ohio Skateout	
1988	Vision: The Vision Pro Skate Escape	
1988	Thrasher: Savannah Slamma	
1988	Powell Peralta: Public Domain	
1988	Powell Peralta: Axe Rated	
1989	NSI: Savannah Slamma III	
1990	Powell Peralta: Propaganda	
1990	All Pro Mini Ramp Jam Hawaiian Style	
1991	Powell Peralta: Celebraty Tropical Fish	
1991	Tracker: The Brotherhood	
1991	Tracker: Stacked	
1991	Powell Peralta: Eight	
1992	Birdhouse Projects: Feasters	
1992	Birdhouse Projects: Ravers	
1993	Birdhouse Projects: Untitled	
1993	411VM: Issue 1	
1994	Hook-Ups: Asian Goddess	
1995	Tracker: Hi-8	
1996	TransWorld: Uno	
1996	Las Vegas Pro Vert '96	
1996	Airwalk Skateboarding Video 96	
1996	Midnight Oil Music Video: "Surf's Up Tonight" (Note: Hawk was featured as a surf stuntman in the music video filmed on the Wave Loch sheet wave in Texas.)	
1998	Baker Bootleg	
1999	Big Brother: Boob	
1999	411VM: Issue 36	
2000	Tony Hawk's Trick Tips Vol. 1	
2000	Tony Hawk's Gigantic Skatepark Tour	
2000	ON Video: Fall 2000	
2000	411VM: Issue 38	
2001	Collage	
2001	CKY 3	
2001	Tony Hawk's Gigantic Skatepark Tour	
2001	Hook-Ups: Destroying America	
2001	Adio: One Step Beyond	
2002	OP King of Skate	
2002	Tony Hawk's Gigantic Skatepark Tour	
2002	The Making of Tony Hawk's Boom Boom Huck Jam	
2002	411VM: Issue 50	
2002	CKY4: The Latest & Greatest	
2003	Thrasher: S.O.T.Y. Video	
2004	411VM: Issue 66	
2004	Tony Hawk's Secret Skatepark Tour	
2005	Adio: Rock Adio	
2005	Red Dragon: Skateboard Party	
2006	Tony Hawk's Secret Skatepark Tour 2	
2007	Birdhouse: The Beginning	
2007	Tony Hawk's Secret Skatepark Tour 3	
2009	Birdhouse: It's Always Sunnies in Australia	
2010	Birdhouse: East Coast Tour	
2011	Birdhouse: Tour Du Monde	
2017	Birdhouse: "Saturdays"	
2021	Nasty Neckface's Wicked Workshop	

=== Music videos ===
Year	Title	Role	Notes	Ref.
1992	Smells Like Nirvana	Featured as an extra (audience member)	Single by "Weird Al" Yankovic	
2002	I'm Just a Kid	Cameo appearance	Single by Simple Plan	
2022	Wild in the Streets	Appearance	As part of the 40th Anniversary reissue	
2026	Play Dead	Cameo appearance	Single by Ice Nine Kills	
2026	C.E.O.	Cameo appearance	Single by Weezer	

=== Video games ===
Year	Title
1999	Tony Hawk's Pro Skater
2000	Tony Hawk's Pro Skater 2
2001	Tony Hawk's Pro Skater 3
2001	Tony Hawk's Pro Skater 2x
2002	Tony Hawk's Pro Skater 4
2003	Tony Hawk's Underground
2004	Tony Hawk's Underground 2
2005	Tony Hawk's American Wasteland
2006	Tony Hawk's Downhill Jam
2006	Tony Hawk's Project 8
2007	Tony Hawk's Proving Ground
2008	Tony Hawk's Motion
2009	Tony Hawk: Vert
2009	Tony Hawk: Ride
2010	Tony Hawk: Shred
2012	Tony Hawk's Pro Skater HD
2014	Tony Hawk's Shred Session
2015	Tony Hawk's Pro Skater 5
2018	Tony Hawk's Skate Jam
2020	Tony Hawk's Pro Skater 1 + 2
2025	Tony Hawk's Pro Skater 3 + 4

== Bibliography ==
- Hawk, Tony (2000). Hawk – Occupation: Skateboarder. New York, New York: ReganBooks. ISBN 0-06-019860-5.

== See also ==
- Tony Hawk's
- The Skatepark Project
- Birdhouse Skateboards
