= Juice (skateboarding magazine) =

Juice Magazine, founded in 1993 in Wilmington, North Carolina, is a skateboarding, surfing and music publication, edited, owned and published by Terri Craft. It includes interviews by skate editor, Jim Murphy, and features editors: Steve Olson, Jay Adams, Dave Duncan, Christian Hosoi, Jim O'Mahoney, and surf editors Jeff Ho, Herbie Fletcher and Dibi Fletcher. The staff includes Terri Craft, editor and Dan Levy, assistant editor. Other interviewers include Jason Jessee, Jeff Ament, Chuck Dukowski, Bill Danforth and Chris Mearkle. There are currently 80 issues of the magazine. Juice Magazine headquarters is located in the birthplace of modern-day skateboarding, Venice, California.

== Interviews ==
The magazine interviews skateboarders, surfers, and musicians. Some of the interviewees include: Skateboarders:

- Andy Kessler "I don’t know of anywhere else in the world that has the same surroundings and energy as New York City. Sometimes ripping through the streets is the best thing you can do on your skateboard."
- Arto Saari
- Chad Muska
- Chris Haslam (skateboarder)
- Curren Caples
- Daewon Song
- Darren Navarette
- Duane Peters
- Greyson Fletcher
- Jake Brown (skateboarder)
- Jake Duncombe
- Jason Jessee
- John Cardiel
- Kevin Kowalski
- Natas Kaupas
- Omar Hassan (skateboarder)
- Pat Duffy
- Rick McCrank
- Steve Caballero
- Tony Hawk

Musicians:

- Bebe Buell
- Bootsy Collins
- Cheetah Chrome
- Cherie Currie
- Chuck Dukowski
- Exene Cervenka
- Glen Matlock
- James Hetfield
- Jeff Ament
- Jello Biafra
- Keith Morris
- King Diamond
- Phil Alvin
- Robert Trujillo
- Ron Emory
- Suzi Quatro
- Tony James
- Wayne Kramer (guitarist)

Surfers:

- Danny Fuller (surfer)
- Laird Hamilton
- LeRoy Grannis
- Makua Rothman
- Peter Mel
- Sunny Garcia

Artists:

- C. R. Stecyk, III
- Dante Ross
- Legs McNeil
- Scott Caan
- Seymour Duncan

== Special Features ==
- Alva Collection: Interviews with the Alva Skateboarding Team
- Bones Brigade Chronicles: Interviews with the Bones Brigade
- Dogtown Chronicles: Interviews with the Z-Boys
- Duty Now For The Future: Interviews with Skatepark Builders

== Dogtown Chronicles ==
Dogtown Chronicles features interviews with the Z-Boys, Zephyr skateboarding team Dogtown and Z-Boys including:

- Jeff Ho Surfboards and Zephyr Productions
- C. R. Stecyk, III
- Skip Engblom
- Tony Alva
- Jay Adams
- Stacy Peralta
- Peggy Oki
- Bob Biniak
- Wes Humpston
- Chris Cahill
- Allen Sarlo
- Nathan Pratt
- Shogo Kubo
- Paul Constantineu
- Wentzle Ruml IV
- Glen E Friedman

== Bibliography ==
- Newman, M. (1996) 'Continental Drift', Billboard, Cincinnati.
