= Greyson Fletcher =

American skateboarder, surfer, artist, actor from California

- Born: March 9, 1991; Orange County, California
- Occupations: skateboarder, surfer, artist, actor
- Years active: 2001–present

Greyson Thunder Fletcher is an American professional free skateboarder, surfer, visual artist and actor from San Clemente, California. He starred in the HBO series John from Cincinnati and his artworks have been exhibited in New York's Gagosian Gallery. His skateboard sponsors include; Arbor Skateboards, Birdhouse Skateboards, Independent Truck Company, OJ Wheels and RVCA.

== Artworks ==
In January 2023, Fletcher's solo showing “Skate Fast, Slam Hard” opened at Juice Magazine headquarters in Venice Beach, California. The exhibit was curated by Dibi and Herbie Fletcher and included the artist's “Death Box” sculpture and a number of large scale oil and canvas pieces. The subject of the works revolved around humanity and its contributions to the destruction of the environment and of the expectations of good and evil.

In July 2023, Fletcher participated as a special guest artist at the Los Angeles art and music collective Surf Skate Roots Rock, alongside of legendary skater-artists such as Lance Mountain, Lonnie Toft, Tony Alva, Marty Grimes, George Wilson, Steve Olson and others. The event was curated by artist, Dogtown skater Alan Scott.

== Acting and surfing appearances ==
In 2007, Fletcher appeared as the character Shaun Yost in all ten episodes of the HBO series John from Cincinnati with Rebecca De Mornay and Luis Guzmán. His character is the 14-year-old son of Butchie Yost and Tina Blake; a surfing prodigy. Tina gave Shaun to his grandparents, Cissy and Mitch Yost, to raise the day he was born.

Greyson Fletcher appeared (as himself) in the surfing documentary View From a Blue Moon (2015) with Kelly Slater and other top surfers. In 2021 he appeared in the surfing film Raw Days (2021). In 2023, Fletcher starred in "Convergence" directed by Perry Gershkow, an intimate look into the surfing lives of Conner Coffin, Nate Tyler, and Greyson Fletcher.

== Early life and upbringing ==
Greyson Fletcher was born in Orange County California into a family of surfers and skateboarders. He is a member of what has come to be known in costal Southern California as the Fletcher Dynasty, four generations of surf-skate innovators. His great grandfather was Walter Hoffman, a surf industry pioneer and early big wave pioneer. His grandfather is legendary surfer Herbie Fletcher, his father is Christian Fletcher (one of the pioneers of 1980's progressive surfing), and his uncle Nathan Fletcher is a world-famous big wave rider.

Like his grandfather, Herbie Fletcher, Greyson found skating at an early age and was soon hooked. When the San Clemente Skate Park was first opened, he was there daily. Herbie would drop Greyson off in the morning, bring him lunch in the afternoon, and pick him up at the end of the day.
