= Jeff Ho Surfboards and Zephyr Productions =

- Location within California
- 34.00703°N 118.48852°W

History
- Built: 1922

Site notes
- Architect: J. L. Schrurs
- Website: jeffhozephyr.com

Santa Monica Historic Landmark
- Designated: May 14, 2007

Jeff Ho Surfboards and Zephyr Productions was a surfboard manufacturing facility and surf shop located in Santa Monica, California, that opened in 1971 and closed in 1976. The building was designated as a city landmark in 2007.

== History ==
In 1971, Jeff Ho, Skip Engblom and Craig Stecyk opened Jeff Ho Surfboards and Zephyr Productions, a surfboard company in Santa Monica, California and also used the south wing of the facility for manufacturing their surfboards. The building is located at 2003–2011 Main Street.

The Jeff Ho/Zephyr shop closed in December 1976, and was reopened in May 1977 by original Jeff Ho/Zephyr employee Nathan Pratt as Horizons West Surfboards by Nathan Pratt. Horizons West closed in August 2010. The space reopened as a coffee shop called Dogtown Coffee in August 2012.

== Significance ==
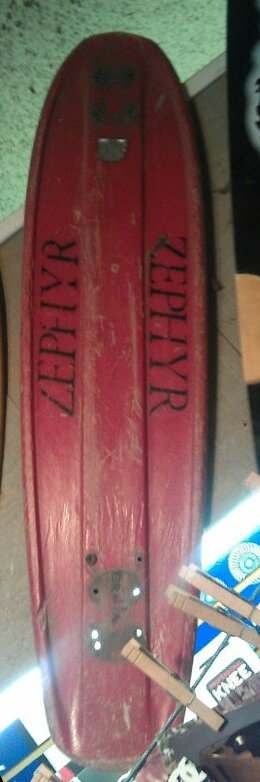
Stacey Peralta's original ZEPHYR board which was seen in Dogtown and Z-Boys and Lords of Dogtown

Jeff Ho and Skip Engblom formed the Zephyr Surf Team, made up of local surfers who frequented Pacific Ocean Park in the run-down area of South Santa Monica/Venice known as Dogtown. Ho and Engblom later formed the Zephyr Skate Team, which became widely known as the Z-Boys and popularized the sport.

The Z-boys were based at the Jeff Ho / Zephyr shop, and it was a regular hang-out for the members. Ronnie Jay was head salesman and Nathan Pratt apprenticed under Jeff Ho, Skip Engblom and Craig Stecyk in surfboard building.

The team included Jay Adams, Tony Alva, Bob Biniak, Chris Cahill, Paul Constantineau, Shogo Kubo, Jim Muir, Peggy Oki, Nathan Pratt, Stacy Peralta, Wentzle Ruml and Allen Sarlo and was the subject of a 2001 documentary film, Dogtown and Z-Boys, and a 2005 biographical film, Lords of Dogtown; both feature the Jeff Ho/Zephyr Surf Shop.

== City Landmark Designation ==
In 2007, the building housing Horizons West Surf Shop (formerly Jeff Ho Surfboards and Zephyr Productions) was designated to be demolished to construct condominiums. Local skaters and surfers, led by Jacob Samuel began fighting to protect the building. On April 9, 2007, an application was filed to designate the building as a City Landmark. On May 14, 2007, the Planning and Community Development Department of Santa Monica ruled that the building met the minimum of four eligible criteria and officially designated it as a City Landmark.
