= Allen Sarlo =

American surfer

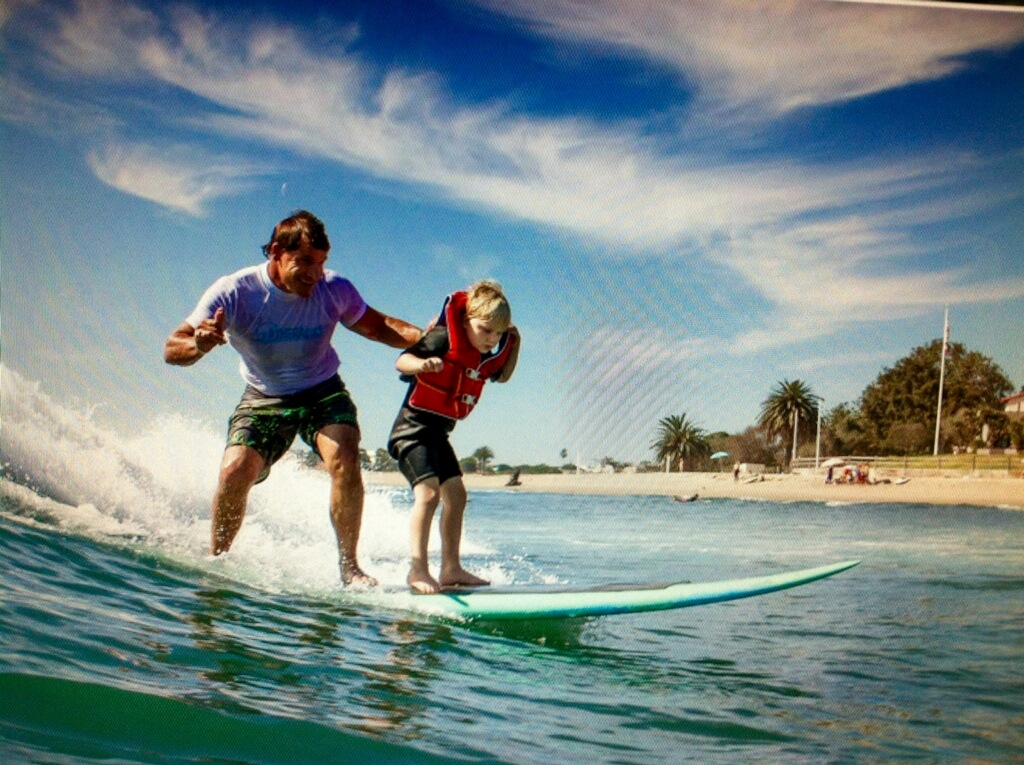
- Sarlo in 2014
- Born: Allen Kenneth Sarlo; January 9, 1958 (age 67); Venice, Los Angeles, California, U.S.
- Other names: Wave Killer
- Occupation: Professional surfer
- Known for: Member of the Z-Boys
- Spouse: Deborah Sarlo
- Children: 2

Allen Sarlo (born January 9, 1958) is an American surfer, most prominently known as one of the original members of the Z-Boys surf and skateboarding team. Surfing Magazine recognized him as the first to "kill" a wave. The aggressive and slashing style of surfing he pioneered during the 1970's earned him the nickname "Wave Killer". He is considered by many as "The King of Malibu".

== Early life ==
Sarlo grew up in a part of Venice, California known to locals as "Dogtown". Sarlo began surfing at the age of 5 and by 13, he had won his first competition, the boys' division of an amateur event in El Segundo, California. At 14, he was surfing the infamous "Cove" at the POP pier in Venice. In 1974, at age 16, Sarlo took first place at the Malibu 4-A contest. His progressive surfing style was ahead of its time and challenged the old-school style of surfing, with strong and aggressive wave maneuvers. That same year, he won the West Coast Junior Championships. By 1977, Sarlo was sporting the media given nickname "Wave Killer" and surfing around the world.

== Career ==
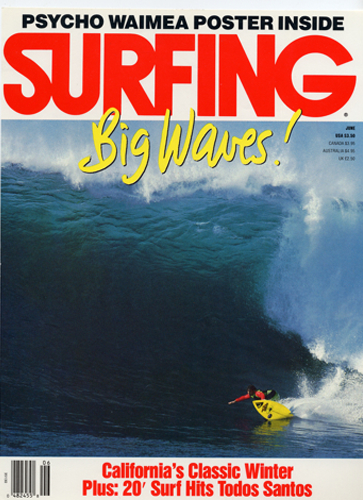
Sarlo on the cover of Surfing Magazine (1995)

In 1977, Sarlo joined the professional international circuit after taking first place in the West Coast Junior Championships. In his first event in South Africa, he finished in a tie for 15th place, Shaun Thompson would go on to take first. In 2000, Sarlo placed 5th in the Quicksilver's World Masters, held in Hossegor, France. He won the Malibu International in both 2008 and 2009.

Sarlo has been sponsored by Body Glove, Quiksilver, Channel Island Surfboards, Jeff Ho Surfboards and Zephyr Productions.

By the 1980s, Sarlo had finished surfing the Pro-Tour and pursued a career in real estate.

== Personal life ==
In 1986, Sarlo married his high school sweetheart, Deborah. Their daughter, Sophie, was born in 1989 and their son, Colton, in 1993.

Sarlo is also an expert kite surfer.

== In popular culture ==
Sarlo is featured in the 2001 award-winning documentary Dogtown and Z-Boys. The film documents his adolescence as part of the Zephyr and his athletically intense surfing style.

In June 1990, the cover of Surfing Magazine shocked the surfing community with a photo of Sarlo doing a bottom turn on a 20+ ft wave. Until that cover came out, big wave surfing was all about taking the drop and getting out alive. He performed stunt work for Heath Ledger in the 2005 film Lords of Dogtown.

He made featured appearances in the surf films "Wave Warriors" and "Following the Lotus".
