= Bobby Suryadi =

- Born: April 7, 1971 (age 54); Bandung, Indonesia
- Occupations: Disc jockey; record producer; composer
- Years active: 1989–present
- Musical career
- Genres: House music; Electronic music; Electro; Electronic dance music
- Years active: 1989–present
- Label: Stadium Production

Bobby Suryadi (born 7 April 1971 in Bandung, Indonesia) is an Indonesian disc jockey and record producer. He began his career performing in various clubs and music events in Jakarta since the late 1980s.

In September 2023, Suryadi celebrated three decades of his career by holding an event titled Immortal Wave Sound S.O.S: 30 Years of Career Bobby Suryadi at Sunset Beach, Beach City International Stadium, Ancol Jakarta. The event was organised by Bigbang Promosindo in collaboration with We Offers Wonders and also marked eight years of his project Stadium Production. It featured performances by several Indonesian DJs, including Riri Mestica, Yasmin, R Jodi, and Nash Balfas.

== Career ==
Bobby began his career as a disc jockey in the late 1980s. He later became a resident DJ at several nightclubs in Jakarta, including WAVE Hotel Horison Ancol and Atalanta Discotheque. He gained recognition performing at Stadium Jakarta, where he became known for his ability to blend various music genres and build an energetic dance floor atmosphere.

In addition to club performances, Bobby has been invited to perform at various music events and local festivals, expanding his presence within Indonesia’s electronic music industry.

Bobby has built his career as an electronic music DJ and producer, performing at festivals and clubs both in Indonesia and abroad. He has also collaborated or performed alongside several international DJs and producers, including Armin van Buuren and Tiësto.

== Personal life ==
Bobby Suryadi is married to Aprilliana, who is also a disc jockey. Their relationship began with Aprilliana’s interest in the DJ world and her desire to learn directly from Bobby. The couple has one child.

== Controversy ==
Bobby has expressed critical views regarding the development of the DJ scene in Indonesia. He stated that some DJs today tend to emphasize popularity over technical skills, a comment that sparked debate within the DJ community.

== Discography ==
=== Albums ===
Year	Title
2025	Infinite Rhythm of Life
2014	Stadium Jakarta
2015	11 Years of Spinnin’
2016	Ambient/Dream Pop
2007	Essential Feat DJ 19 Japan

=== Singles ===
Year	Title
2013	Sound of Stadium
2013	Globe
2024	Just Hold On Maya
2024	Love Beyond the Shadows of Time
2024	Love Lost in the Rain

=== Other appearances ===
Year	Live recording	Label
2016	Sound of Stadium 2015	Stadium Production
2016	Invashion Indonesia	Stadium Production
2014	Sound of Stadium – New Year Edition 2014	Stadium Production
2014	The Future Is Now 2013	Stadium Production

== Awards ==
- The Best DJ of the Year 2007 – Juice Magazine
- The Best Resident DJ of the Year 2007 – Ravelex Electronic Dance Music Awards (REDMA)
- The Best Progressive DJ of the Year 2010 – REDMA
- The Best Resident DJ 2010 – Paranoia Awards
- Indonesia Favorite DJ 2010 – IndoClubbers
- The Best Resident DJ of the Year 2011 – REDMA
- The Best Progressive DJ 2011 – REDMA
- #5 Indonesia Top DJ 2011 – REDMA Top 50 DJ of the Year
- Indonesian Favorite DJ 2011/2012 – IndoClubbers
- DJ of the Year 2012 – Paranoia Awards
- Milestone (Lifetime Achievement) 2017 – Paranoia Awards
