= Lords of Dogtown =

- Theatrical release poster
- Directed by: Catherine Hardwicke
- Written by: Stacy Peralta
- Produced by: John Linson
- Starring: Emile Hirsch; Victor Rasuk; John Robinson; Michael Angarano; Nikki Reed; Heath Ledger; Rebecca De Mornay; Johnny Knoxville
- Cinematography: Elliot Davis
- Edited by: Nancy Richardson
- Music by: Mark Mothersbaugh
- Production companies: TriStar Pictures; Columbia Pictures; Art Linson Productions; Indelible Pictures; Senator International
- Distributed by: Sony Pictures Releasing
- Release date: June 3, 2005 (United States)
- Running time: 107 minutes (theatrical); 110 minutes (unrated)
- Country: United States
- Languages: English; Spanish
- Budget: $25 million
- Box office: $13.4 million

Lords of Dogtown is a 2005 American biographical drama film that captures the rise of skateboarding culture in 1970s Santa Monica and Venice, California. Directed by Catherine Hardwicke and written by Stacy Peralta, a key figure in the skateboarding community, the film chronicles the lives of the Z-Boys, a group of young skateboarders who revolutionized the sport with their aggressive style and innovative tricks. The story focuses on the lives of three of these skateboarders: Tony Alva, Stacy Peralta, and Jay Adams, as they navigate fame, rivalry, and personal challenges. The film explores the impact of commercialization on the sport and the lives of its practitioners. Lords of Dogtown was released by Sony Pictures Releasing on June 3, 2005. Despite mixed reviews and underperforming at the box office, it has gained a cult following and is recognized for its authentic portrayal of skateboarding culture and history.

== Plot ==
In the Dogtown area of Santa Monica/Venice in the mid-1970s, teenagers Tony Alva, Stacy Peralta, and Jay Adams enjoy the life of skating and surfing the pier with board designer Skip Engblom and other locals. One day, Skip is given polyurethane wheels for the skateboards in his shop, Zephyr Surf Shop. Sid, a friend of the boys who works in the same shop, invites Tony, Jay, Stacy, and the other locals to test the new wheels. After witnessing what skaters could now do with the wheels, Skip decides to add Tony, Jay, Sid and others to his Zephyr skate team. The team proves to be a success, winning many contests.

A period of hot weather reduces the surf at the pier and the official declaration of a drought means swimming pools cannot be filled with water. Taking advantage of this, the Z-Boys start sneaking into local backyard pools to skate in, ignoring Skip's practice sessions. After winning many major contests, Stacy, Jay, and Tony start getting noticed by major skating companies looking to take the boys from Skip.

One night at a party, a company owner named Topper Burks convinces Tony that Skip is holding him back and that it is time to make him famous worldwide. Tony accepts his offer and leaves the team. Jay leaves the team as well, looking to make more money to help his mom. Despite Skip's desperate offers to keep him on the team, Stacy is the last to leave, as he begins getting offers to skate and appear on television. Sad and angry, Skip decides to shut down the Zephyr Skate Team.

The three boys become major celebrities. Tony and Stacy now skate for money rather than the passion that Jay continues to skate for. They become rivals and compete against each other in various contests. Soon, matters start spiraling out of control; at a major skating championship that they all take part in, Tony gets into a fight with another skater and gets violently knocked out, temporarily halting his career. Jay leaves the company he had endorsed when they sacrifice quality for cheap materials.

Back in Venice, the pier that the Z-Boys use to surf around burns down, which affects them all. Jay shaves his hair and becomes a gang member. Skip, still selling surfboards in his shop, finally decides to settle down and continues his passion for sanding and creating surfboards, as well as solving his financial troubles by selling his shop.

Sid's long-time equilibrium problem turns out to be caused by a brain tumor, and he undergoes surgery. Though Stacy, Tony, and Jay have all gone their separate ways, they all show up at the same time to visit Sid. Stacy reveals that he is leaving his company to start his own. Stacy, Tony, and Jay skate the emptied pool and bring Sid into the fun in his wheelchair, referencing all the good times they had before they became a skate team.

Closing cards reveal that Tony Alva went on to become skateboarding's first world champion and runs Alva Skates; Stacy Peralta started Powell Peralta, a modern popular skating company that included a 14-year-old Tony Hawk as part of its Bones Brigade team; and Jay, too, achieved the only kind of success at skating and surfing he really cared about, becoming known as the "spark that started the flame" Original Seed; Sid died of brain cancer shortly after the DOGBOWL sessions.

== Cast ==
=== Main cast ===
- Emile Hirsch as Jay Adams
- John Robinson as Stacy Peralta
- Victor Rasuk as Tony Alva
- Heath Ledger as Skip Engblom
- Michael Angarano as Sid
- Nikki Reed as Kathy Alva
- Rebecca De Mornay as Philaine
- William Mapother as Donnie
- Vincent Laresca as Chino
- Elden Henson as Billy Z
- Mitch Hedberg as Frank Nasworthy
- Stephanie Limb as Peggy Oki
- Mike Ogas as Bob Biniak
- Don Nguyen as Shogo Kubo
- Melonie Diaz as Blanca
- Eddie Cahill as Larry Gordon
- Laura Ramsey as Gabrielle
- Steve Badillo as Ty Page
- Pablo Schreiber as Craig Stecyk
- America Ferrera as Thunder Monkey
- Sofia Vergara as Amelia
- Chelsea Hobbs as Caroline
- Ned Bellamy as Peter Darling
- Shea Whigham as Drake Landon

=== Cameos ===
- Johnny Knoxville as Topper Burks
- Allen Sarlo as Himself
- Charles Napier as Nudie
- Jay Adams as House party guest
- Tony Alva as Oregon man at the party
- Stacy Peralta as TV director
- Skip Engblom as Seattle race starter
- Tony Hawk as Astronaut
- Jeremy Renner as Jay Adams' manager
- Joel McHale as TV reporter
- Alexis Arquette as Tranny
- Bai Ling as Punky photographer
- Lance Mountain as UK policeman
- Craig Stecyk as Seattle race photographer

== Development ==
Both David Fincher and Fred Durst were slated to direct the film, but Catherine Hardwicke eventually landed the job, and Fincher stayed on as executive producer. The film was shot in Imperial Beach in San Diego County.

== Release ==
Lords of Dogtown was the first film to be released by both Columbia Pictures and TriStar Pictures which are both trademarked by Sony Pictures Entertainment and are sometimes referred to as Columbia TriStar Pictures. It was the only film released from both Columbia and TriStar until Resident Evil in 2026.

== Reception ==
Upon its release, Lords of Dogtown received mostly mixed reviews. The film holds a 55% approval rating on Rotten Tomatoes based on 146 reviews, with an average rating of 5.95/10. The site's consensus reads: "Lords of Dogtown, while slickly made and edited, lacks the depth and entertaining value of the far superior documentary on the same subject, Dogtown and Z-Boys." Metacritic reports a score of 56% based on 35 critics, indicating "mixed or average" reviews. Audiences polled by CinemaScore gave the film an average grade of "B+" on an A+ to F scale.

Ledger's portrayal of Skip Engblom was applauded for its realism and is considered one of the film's principal highlights. Joe Donnelly, who knew Engblom, was impressed by Ledger's attention to detail, saying, "He's almost eerie in how precisely he nailed not only the mannerisms, cadence and physical presence of Skip... but also how he raises Skip's spirit, which is the heart and soul and most what's really great in a not-altogether-great film."

Luke Davies of The Monthly concedes how flamboyant the character is, but says the film is saved by Ledger's emotional depth: "The performance constantly sails close to hammy – Engblom was, by all accounts, a flamboyant character – but is pulled back, the wildness offset by a surprising depth of sadness. As in a number of Ledger roles, a kind of animal wisdom and melancholy exists side-by-side with gangly comedy."

A.O. Scott of The New York Times also highlighted Ledger's performances, stating, "Skip is always volatile, frequently drunk and consistently the most entertaining figure in the movie". He also praised the movie as a whole, stating, "Lords of Dogtown from start to finish is pretty much a blast".

However, the movie has gained a general cult following since its release. It is also considered to be one of the best skateboarding movies of all time according to many fans of the sport.

== Accolades ==
The Central Ohio Film Critics Association named Heath Ledger Actor of the Year for this film.

Lords of Dogtown is at #417 on the 2008 Empire list of "The 500 Greatest Movies of All Time".

== Soundtrack ==
The film's soundtrack features songs by Sparklehorse (covering Pink Floyd's "Wish You Were Here"), Deep Purple, Black Sabbath, Cher, David Bowie, Neil Young, T.Rex, Jimi Hendrix, and Iggy Pop among others, as well as a cover of The Clash's "Death or Glory" by Social Distortion.

== Home media ==
The film was released on VHS, DVD, and UMD on September 27, 2005. The DVD includes original Z-Boys cameos, director and cast commentaries, deleted scenes, a making-of feature, and make-up test outtakes.

== Television series ==
In January 2021, it was announced that a television series based on the movie was in development for Freevee.

== See also ==
- Dogtown and Z-Boys
