= C. R. Stecyk III =

American artist, writer, photojournalist, and filmmaker

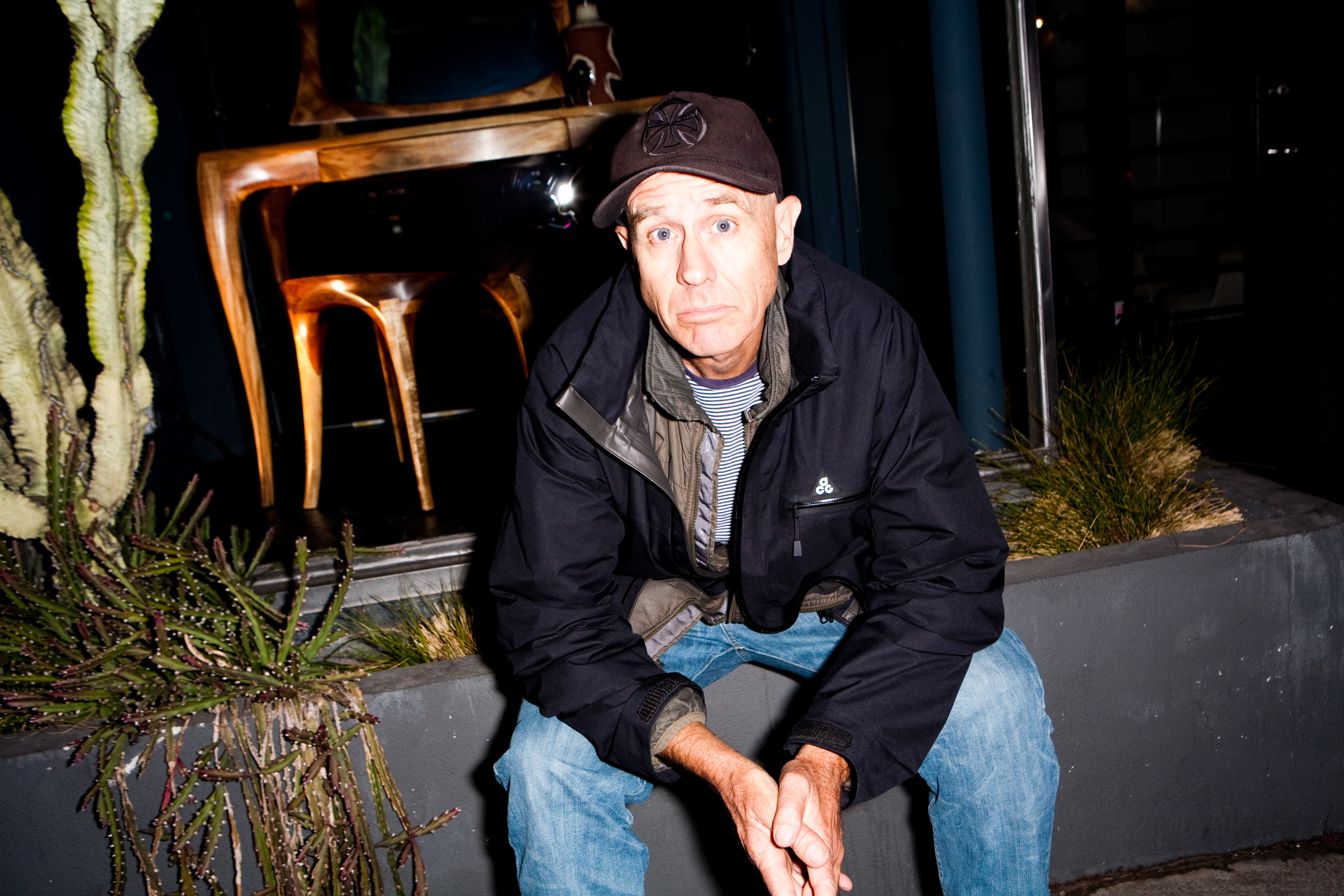
- Stecyk in 2010
- Born: Craig R. Stecyk III; 1950 (age 75–76)
- Known for: Photography, writing
- Notable work: Dogtown and Z-Boys

Craig R. Stecyk III (born 1950) is an American artist, writer, photojournalist, and filmmaker who has documented and influenced the surf, skate, and snowboarding cultures.

== Biography ==
A Southern California native, Stecyk is known for his photographs of the 1970s and '80s, and for documenting surfing and skateboarding culture, including articles for Skateboarder Magazine in the mid-1970s describing the innovative developments of the Z-Boys skateboarding team.

In 1972, Jeff Ho, Skip Engblom, and Stecyk opened a surf shop called Jeff Ho and Zephyr Surfboard Productions in Santa Monica, California.

Stecyk co-wrote the 2001 award-winning documentary Dogtown and Z-Boys with Stacy Peralta. Pablo Schreiber plays Stecyk in the 2005 film Lords of Dogtown.

He co-wrote the book Dogtown and Z-Boys with Glen E. Friedman, published in 2019.

== Publications ==
- Dogtown – The Legend of the Z-Boys, C.R. Stecyk III & Glen E. Friedman, Burning Flags Press, 2000, ISBN 0-9641916-4-4
