= Shogo Kubo =

American skateboarder (1959–2014)

Personal information
- Born: September 19, 1959 Kagoshima city, Kyushu, Japan
- Died: June 24, 2014 (aged 54) Hawaii Kai, Hawaii, U.S.
- Spouse: Michiyo

Sport
- Country: United States
- Sport: Skateboarding

Shogo Kubo (September 19, 1959 – June 24, 2014) was a Japanese-American skateboarding pioneer and one of the original members of the Z-Boys that formed in Venice, California in 1975.

Born in Kagoshima, Japan, Kubo began skateboarding when he was 6 years old.

When he moved to the United States, he took an interest in surfing. He became friends with Jay Adams after responding to a newspaper ad about a surfboard Adams was selling. Kubo used Adams's skateboard, which eventually led to his passion for skateboarding and his joining the Z-Boys. His style was widely respected by his peers. He influenced future pro-skateboarders such as Christian Hosoi and was featured in the Dogtown photos of Glen E. Friedman.

Shogo left the competitive scene in the 1980s, later moving to Hawaii where he got married and had two children. In the 2005 American biographical drama film Lords of Dogtown, Kubo was portrayed by pro skateboarder Don Nguyen. Kubo designed a sneaker for Nike in 2007, the Nike SB "Shogo" Blazers. Kubo had worn Nike Blazers while skateboarding since the 1970s.

== Death ==
Kubo was found unresponsive while paddleboarding off Portlock Point in Hawaii Kai, Honolulu. He died of a brain aneurysm at age 54. He was survived by his wife, Michiyo; son, Shota; daughter, Meagan; brothers Yoshifumi and Shinya; and sister, Reiko Masuda.
