= Skip Engblom =

American entrepreneur

Skip Engblom (born January 4, 1948) is an American entrepreneur and one of the co-founders of the Jeff Ho Surfboards and Zephyr Productions Surf Shop in Santa Monica, California. He also helped to create the Zephyr Surf Team and the Zephyr Competition Team, a.k.a. Z-Boys. Engblom was never a remarkable skateboarder himself but was a big influence to the Zephyr team.

Engblom sponsored the Z-Boys including Jay Adams, Tony Alva and Stacy Peralta. Engblom and the Z-Boys frequented a locals only surf spot named "The Cove", which was located at Pacific Ocean Park, in Santa Monica, California, which later burned to the ground. Engblom also played a cameo part in 2005's Lords of Dogtown as a race starter. In the same film, character Skip Engblom was played by Heath Ledger.

In 2023, Engblom was inducted into the Skateboarding Hall of Fame.
