= Skate contest =

A skate contest or skateboarding contest or skateboarding competition is a competition between people skateboarding, usually on a designated course or ramp, typically decided by judges' scoring.

== History ==
The first skate contest took place in 1963 in Hermosa Beach, California, sponsored by Makaha and held at the Pier Avenue Junior High School.

In April 26 & 27, 1975, The Zephyr Boys impress the crowd at the Bahne-Cadillac National Championships held as part of the Del Mar Ocean Festival. Coverage from this skate contest propelled the Z-Boys as first skate celebrities. The unique and aggressive style of the Z-Boys caused a major sensation and controversy at the competition.

In 1982, Tony Hawk won his first skateboard contest at the Del Mar Skate Ranch. In 1983, Tommy Guerrero won the first street-style skateboard contest at Golden Gate Park, in San Francisco.

The first Tampa Pro competition took place in 1995 and was won by Mike Vallely. The first X Games contest took place in 1995. The first Street League Skateboarding contest took place in 2010. Skateboarding made its debut as an Olympic sport at the 2021 Summer Olympics.

== Photos of skate contests ==
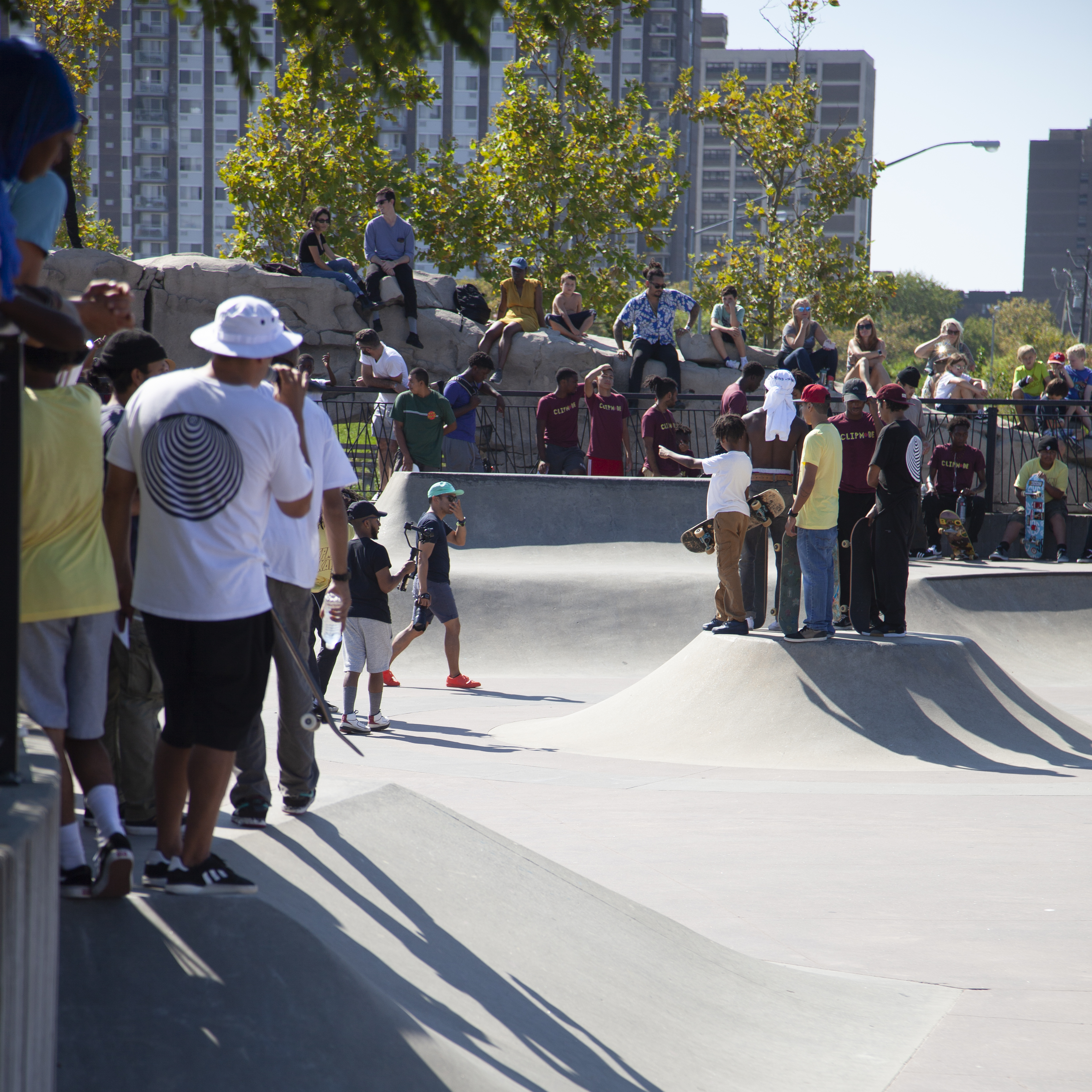

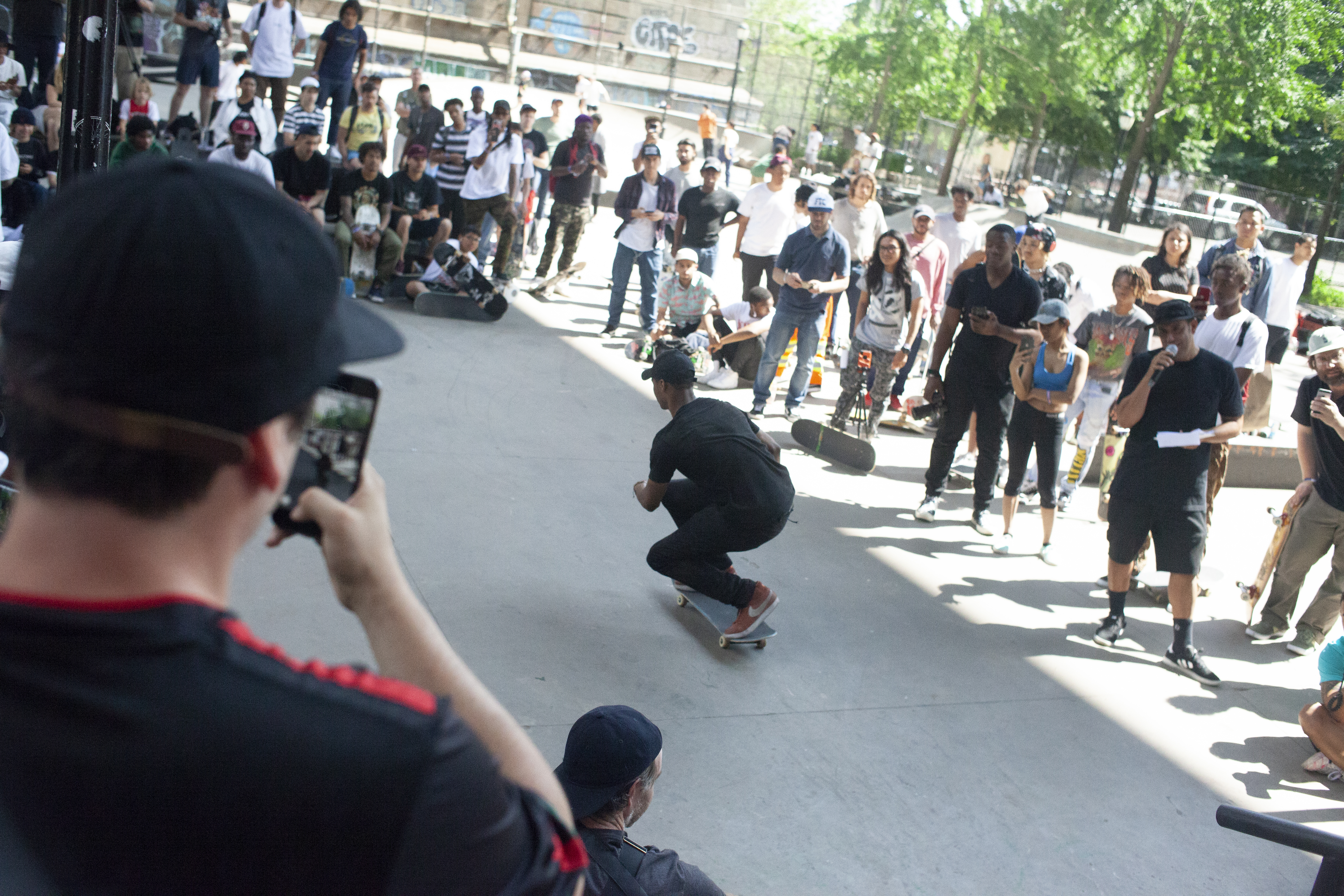

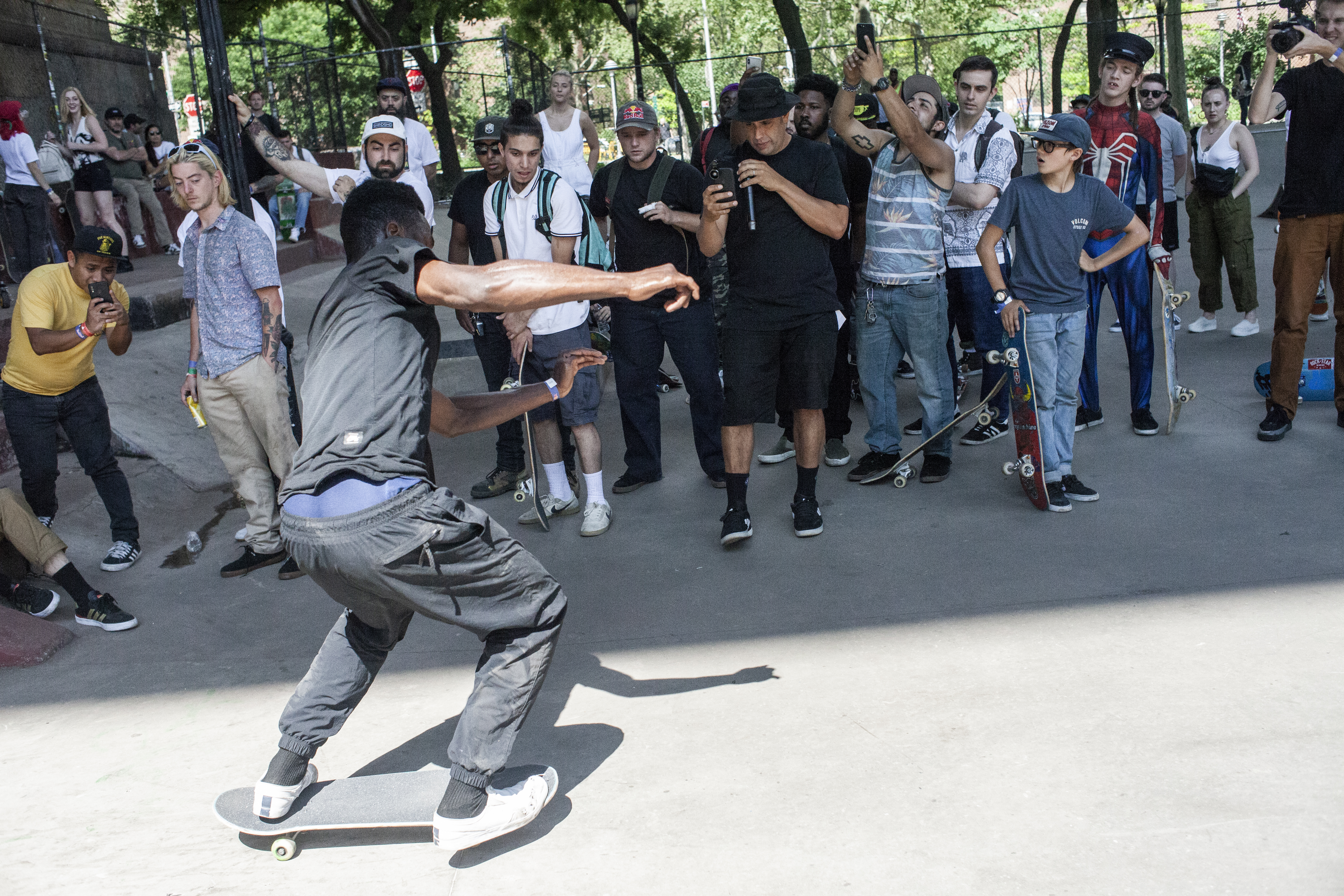

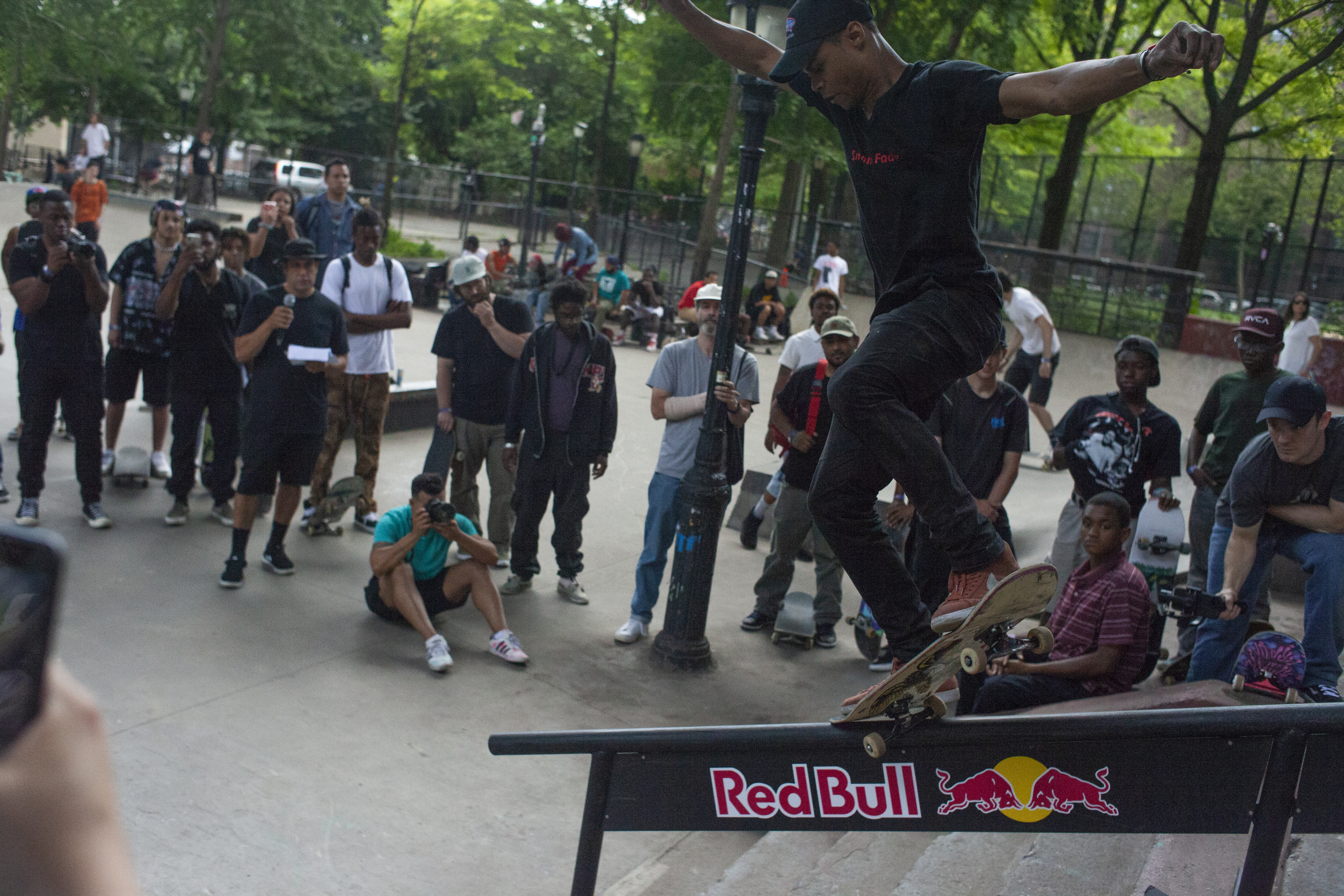

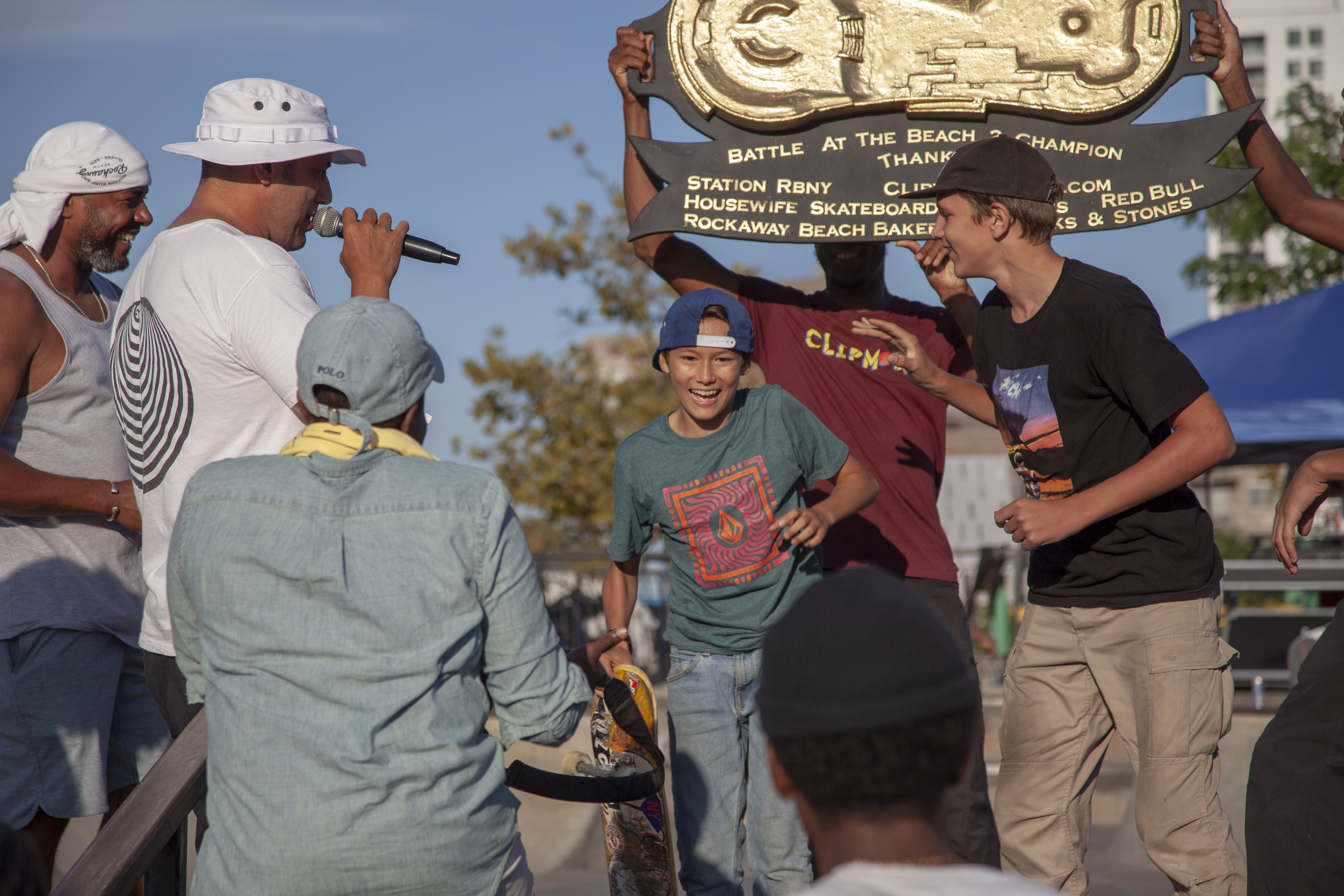

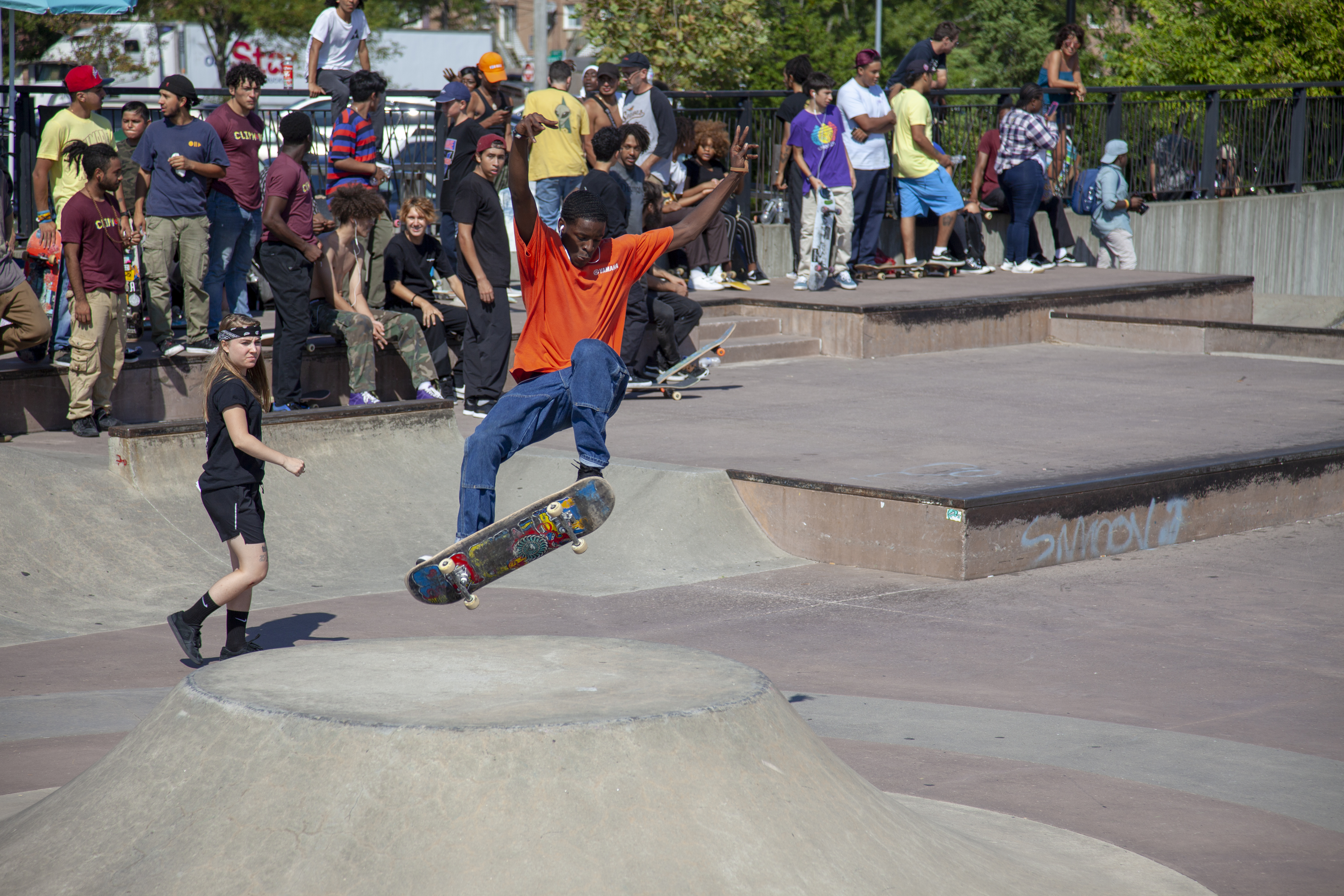

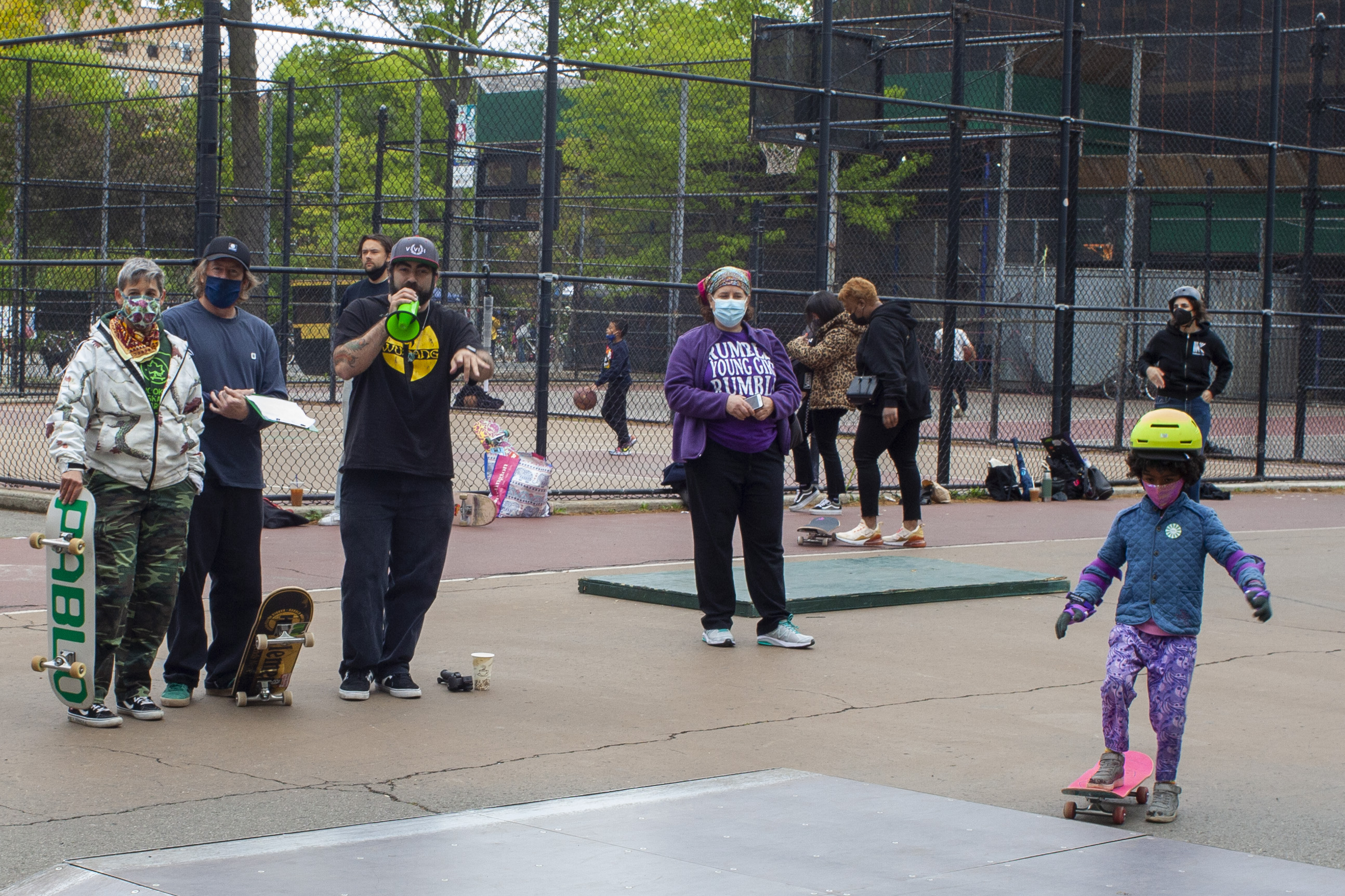

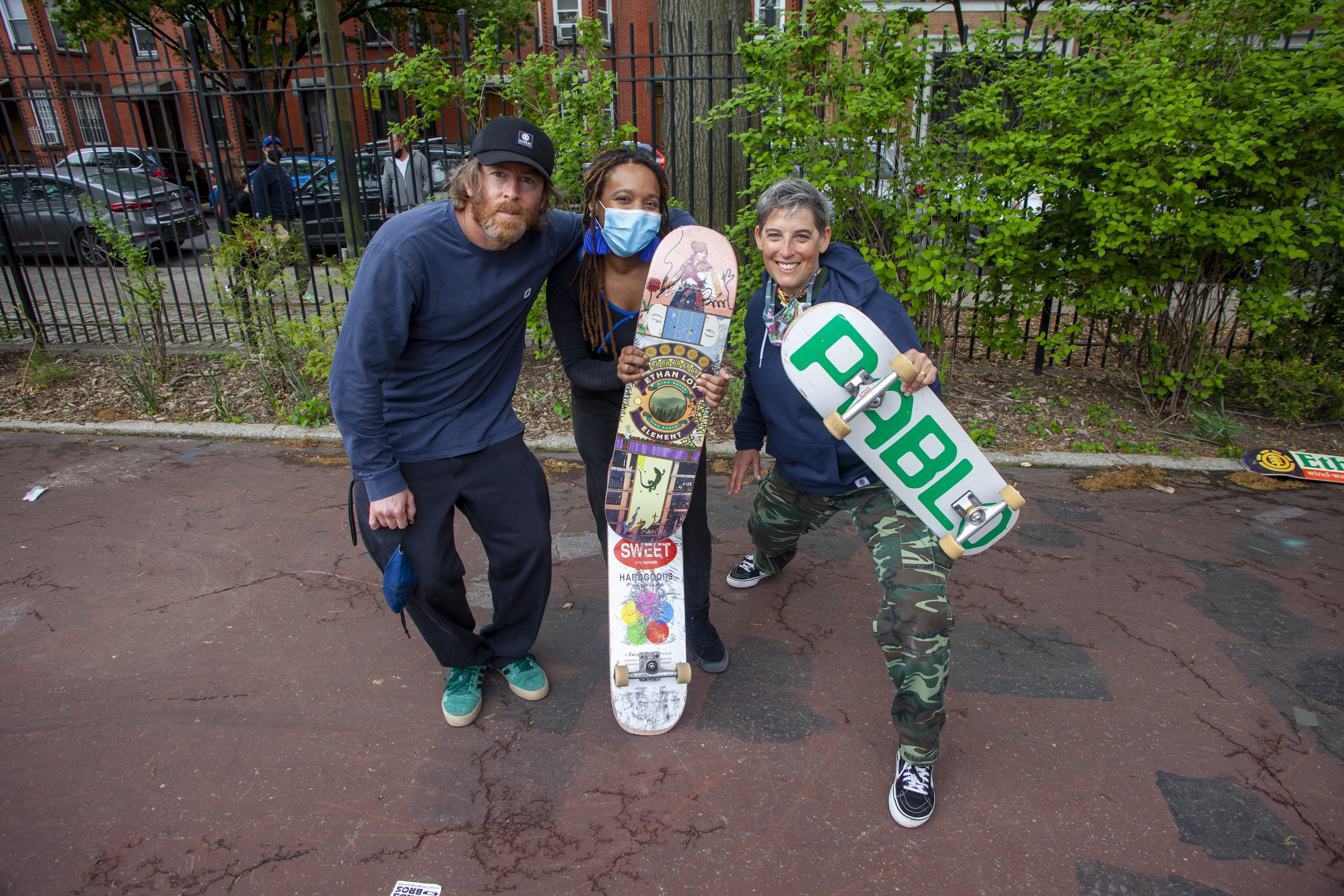

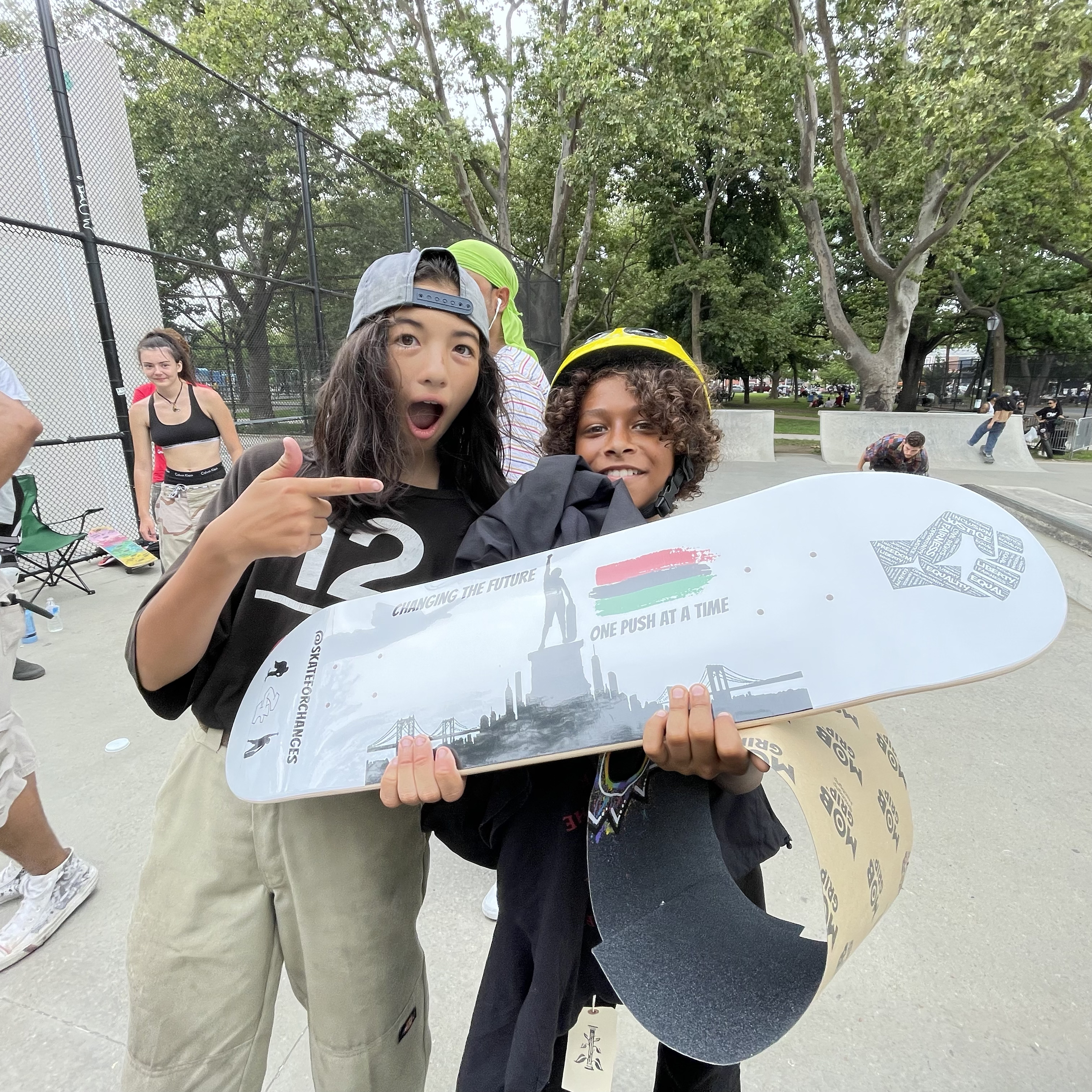

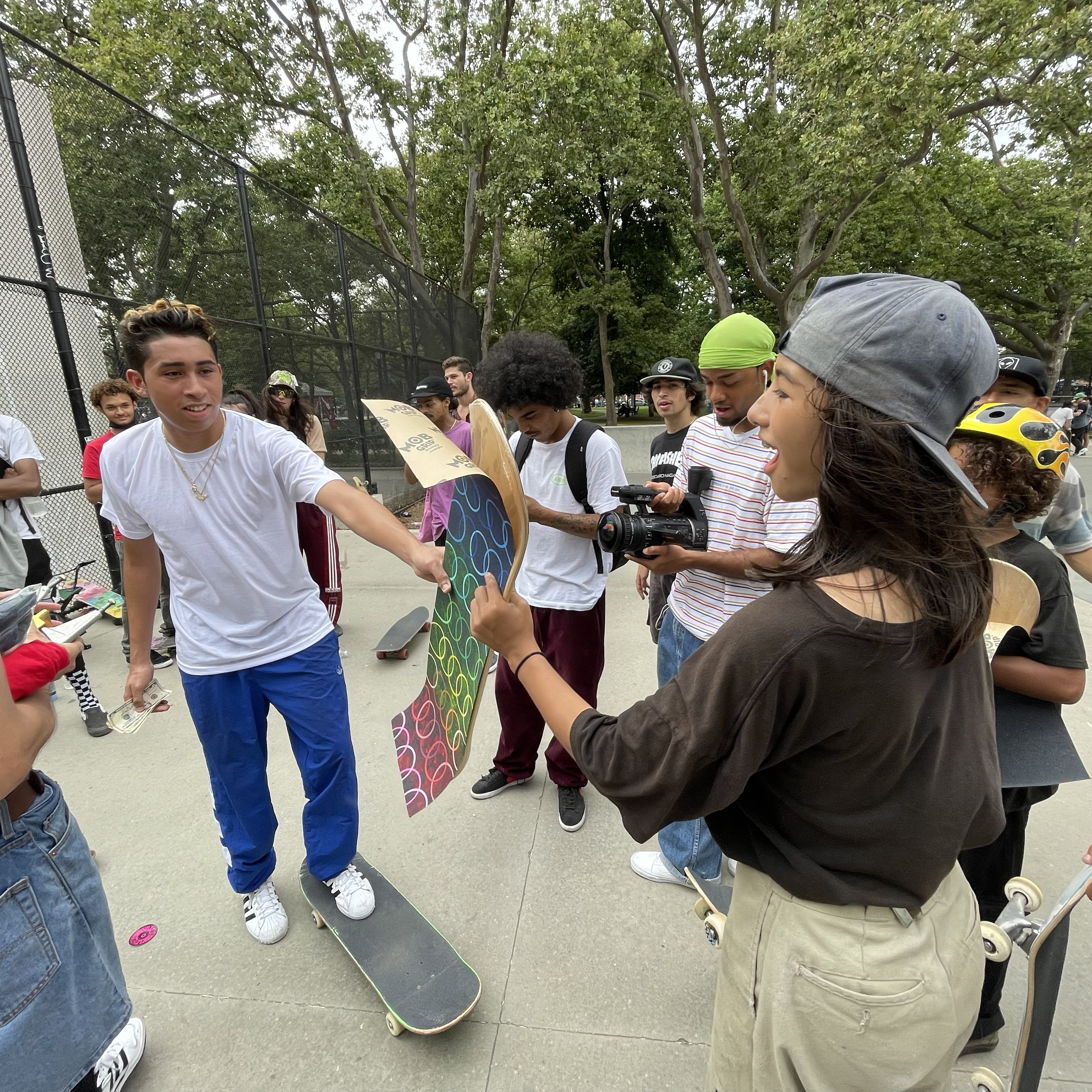

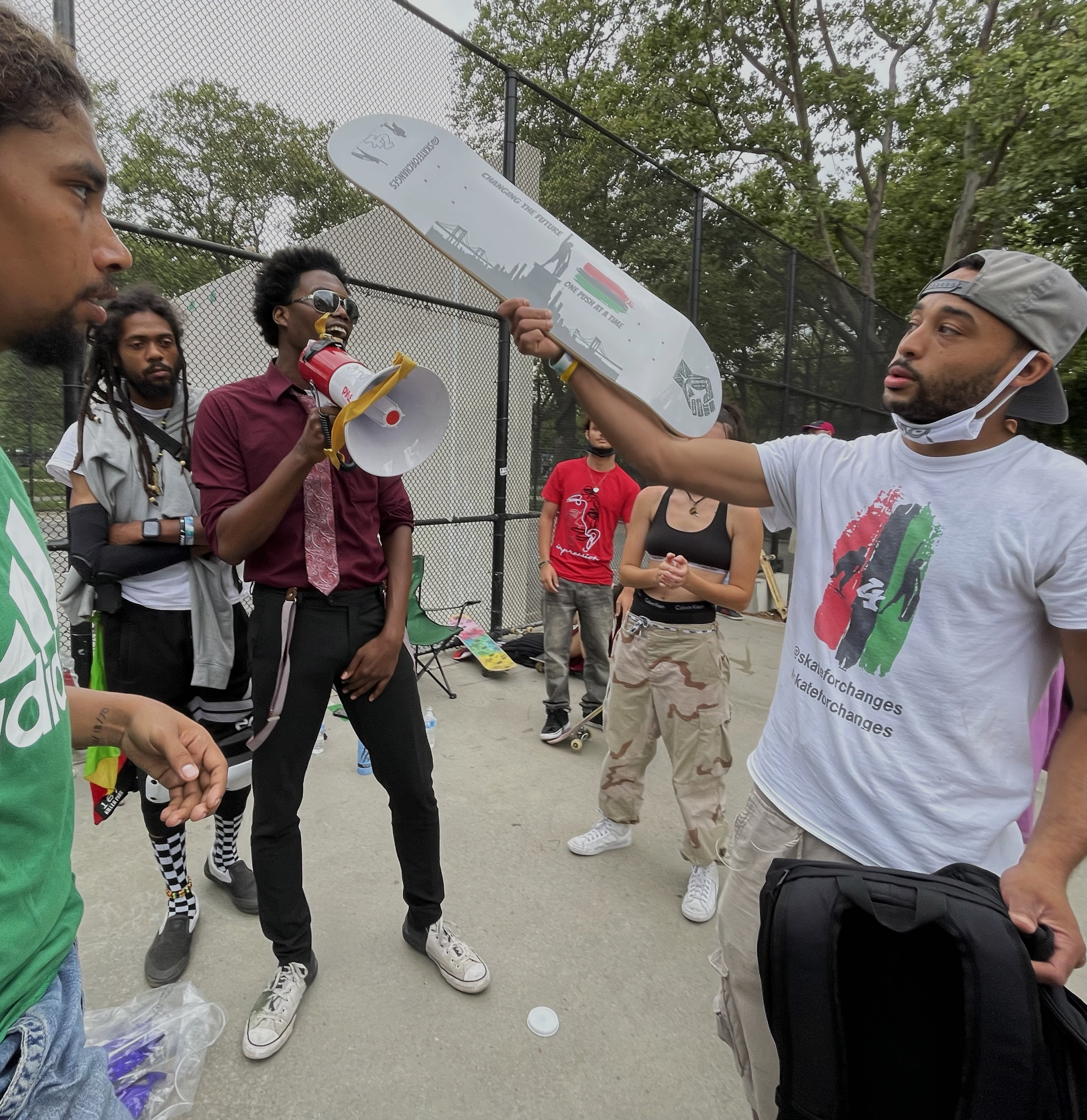

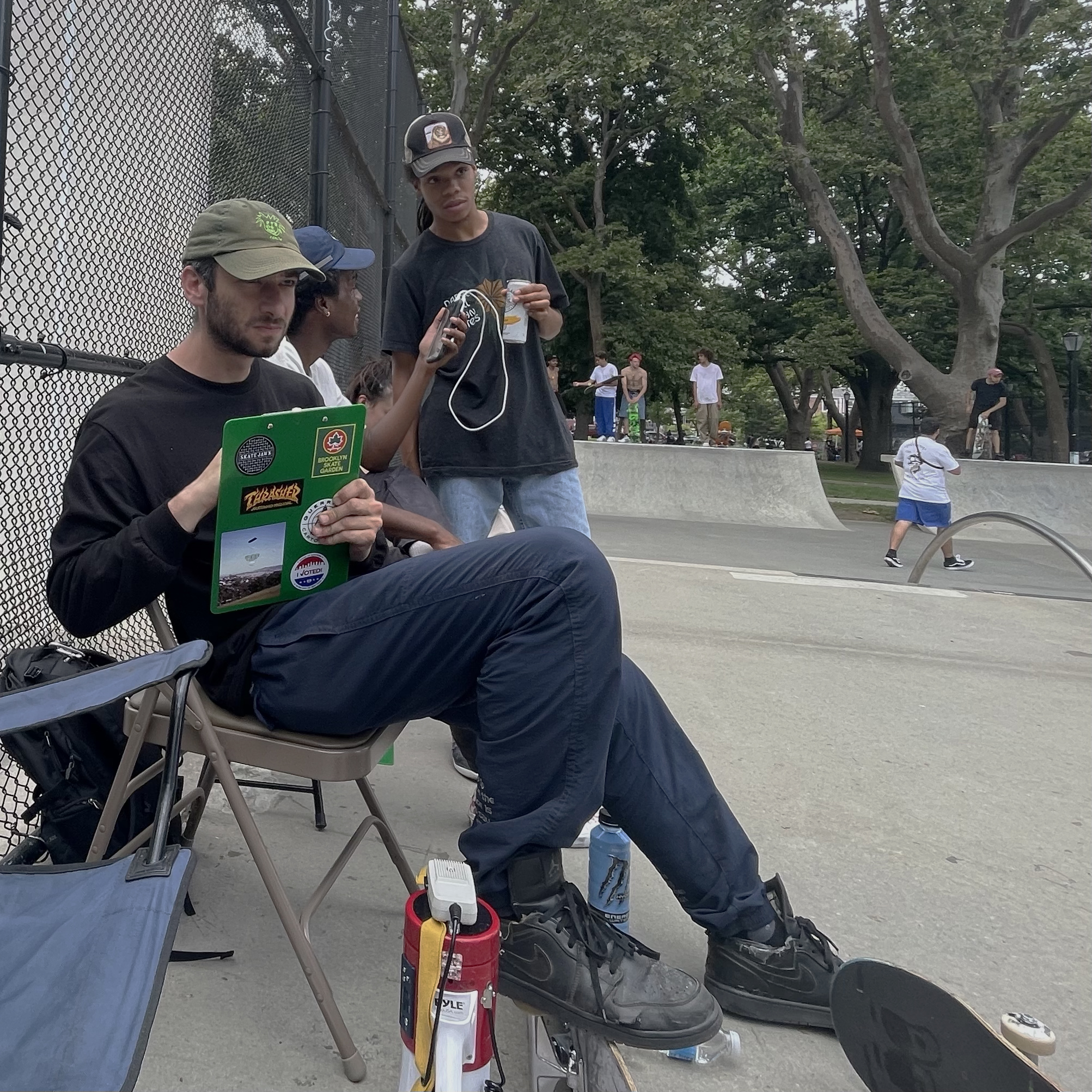
