= Marty Grimes =

American skateboarder

Personal information
- Full name: Marty Grimes
- Nationality: American
- Born: 1962 (age 63–64) Los Angeles, California, U.S.

Sport
- Country: United States
- Sport: Skateboarding

Marty Grimes (born 1962) is a goofy-footed professional American skateboarder from Los Angeles. He is one of the original Los Angeles pool rippers, riding for Dogtown and Zephyr skateboards. Grimes and his brother were the first African-American professional skateboarders, as they both went pro at the same time.

== Early life ==
Grimes grew up in Midtown, Los Angeles. He went to Mar Vista Elementary, where they had a large embankment that Grimes would grow up to skate. At age 10, a family member introduced Grimes to skating. Additionally, as part of the LAUSD desegregation busing, Grimes attended Paul Revere Junior High in Pacific Palisades, which had one of the best banks in the city, a popular skate spot.

=== Skateboarding ===
After competing in the 1975 Del Mar Skateboard Championships, Marty and his brother, Clyde, were offered sponsorships on the EZ Ryder team. Grimes is the first black skater to have a signature model.

Skate Video Appearances	Year
Freewheelin'	1976
Go for It	1976
