= Peggy Oki =

American skateboarder, surfer, artist, and environmental activist

- Born: Peggy E. Oki; April 10, 1956 (age 70); Los Angeles, California U.S.
- Other name: Z-Girl
- Education: University of California, Santa Barbara
- Occupations: Skateboarder, surfer, artist, environmental activist
- Years active: 1970s–present
- Website: peggyoki.com

Peggy E. Oki (born April 10, 1956) is an American skateboarder, surfer, artist, and environmental activist. She was an original member of the Z-Boys and competed with the Zephyr Competition Team in the 1970s. She was the only female member of the Z-Boys.

== Early life and education ==
Oki was born in Los Angeles, California, to Ben Oki and Sadako Oki. Her father was a Sacramento-born Nisei. Her family is originally from Hiroshima, Japan. Oki grew up in West Los Angeles, in an area later called Dogtown. Her father bought Oki (and her brother) her first skateboard when she was 10 years old from the Fedco department store. She said it was a Black Knight skateboard with "Fred Flintstone (stone-age) rock wheels".

In 1973, Oki graduated from Venice High School.

She has an AA in biology from Santa Monica City College, and an AA in fine and studio arts (with Honors) from Santa Barbara City College. Oki received a BFA in painting from the College of Creative Studies at UCSB with an emphasis on environmental art.

== Career ==
In the 1970s, while attending Santa Monica City College, Oki began skating on the original Zephyr Competition Team also known as Z-Boys. Oki, who was a surfer and motocross rider, met skateboarder Jay Adams, who asked her if she wanted to join the Zephyr team. She went to Jeff Ho's shop Jeff Ho Surfboards and Zephyr Productions on Main Street in Venice, where the team was based, and joined the team.

Oki's skateboarding style was described as raw and gritty.

In March 1975, she took first place in Women's Freestyle at the Del Mar Nationals skateboarding competition. She said that she did not enjoy the politics of competing or the wait time involved where there wasn't much skating happening, so stopped shortly after the Del Mar event.

Since 1998, Oki has worked as a freelance illustrator and graphic designer selling fine art cards as Oki Designs. Oki has also worked freelance in the fields of landscape and architectural design.

In 2001, she appeared in the film Dogtown and Z-Boys.

From 2003 to 2008, she taught art at Santa Barbara City College, Continuing Education and youth art programs through the Carpinteria Valley Arts Council.

In March 2004, she founded the Origami Whales Project to raise awareness about commercial whaling in Japan, Norway, and Iceland.

Since 2011, she has been an environmental art instructor at the Origami Whales Project's Whales and Dolphins Ambassador Program. The program works with students to educate them about the human created threats to cetaceans and the ocean habitats where they live.

== Personal life ==
Oki went vegan around 2001 for ethical reasons, and before that she was a vegetarian.

She is involved with many activities such as yoga, skateboarding, rock climbing, and has been a life-long surfer.

== Awards ==
- 2010: Santa Barbara Independent, Local Hero 2010
- 2012: Skateboarding Hall of Fame induction
