= Z-Boys =

Group of American skateboarders

The Zephyr Competition Team (or Z-Boys) were a group of American skateboarders in the mid-1970s from Santa Monica and Venice, California. Originally consisting of 12 members, the Z-boys were originally sponsored by the Jeff Ho Surfboards and Zephyr Productions surf and skate shop. Their innovative surfing-based style and aerial moves formed the foundations of contemporary vert and transition skateboarding. The story of the Z-Boys and the Zephyr shop have been popularized in feature films such as Lords of Dogtown and Dogtown and Z-Boys.

== History ==
=== Initial beginnings ===
The Z-boys began as a surf team for the Zephyr surfboard shop at Santa Monica. Jeff Ho, Skip Engblom, and Craig Stecyk opened the shop, titled Jeff Ho Surfboards and Zephyr Production Team, in 1973, and they soon began recruiting young locals to represent them in surfing competitions. 14-year-old Nathan Pratt was the first member of the team; he originally had worked in the shop as an apprentice surfboard shaper under Ho, Engblom, and Stecyk. In an interview with Juice Magazine, Pratt notes the following:

"Within our world, the surf team was primary and the skate team was secondary. Allen Sarlo, Tony Alva, Jay Adams, Stacy Peralta, Chris Cahill and myself were on the surf team before there was a skate team. We were junior members of the surf team along with John Baum, Jimmy and Ricky Tavarez and Brian Walker. Guys like Ronnie Jay, Wayne Inouye, Wayne Saunders, Pat Kaiser, Barry Amos, Jeff Sibley, Bill Urbany and Adrian Reif were the top dogs. The history, skill and accomplishments of all the team members was represented in those shirts. Then we added Bob Biniak, Wentzle Ruml, Paul Constantineau, Jim Muir, Shogo Kubo and Peggy Oki to the skate team so that a team shirt represented a decent number of people."

In 1974, Allen Sarlo, Jay Adams, Tony Alva, Chris Cahill, and Stacey Peralta joined the Zephyr team; these local youths exhibited street style and aggressive mannerisms both on and off the surfboard. The majority of the team lived in the "Dogtown" area of Santa Monica; their primary surfing spot was the Cove at Pacific Ocean Park. However, thanks to the invention of urethane wheels, the Z-boys began to transition their surfing style to skateboarding.

=== Formation of the Zephyr Competition Team ===
In 1975, Cahill, Pratt, Adams, Sarlo, Peralta, and Alva became the first members of the official Zephyr skateboarding team. Soon after, the Zephyr shop gained the final members of their team, making the total number 12 in all. These additional members were Bob Biniak, Paul Constantineau, Jim Muir, Peggy Oki, Shogo Kubo and Wentzle Ruml. The team began to practice in the backs of four schools in the surrounding area. Taking inspiration from surfer Larry Bertlemann, the Z-boys would skate low to the ground, dragging their hands against the concrete as if they were riding a wave.

=== The Del Mar Nationals ===
The Z-Boys' first appearance at a skateboard competition occurred at the 1975 Del Mar Nationals; the contest was the first major skateboarding competition since the mid 1960s. Their low, aggressive style in the freestyle section of the competition, though innovative, was critiqued by the older establishment of skateboarding. However, half of the finalists at the end of the competition were members of the Zephyr Competition Team: in the Freestyle category, Jay Adams was placed 3rd, Tony Alva 4th; for Slalom, Dennis Harney was 2nd, Nathan Pratt was 4th; finally, for Women’s Freestyle, Peggy Oki was 1st. The performance of the Z-Boys, especially Jay Adams' marked the beginning of a national change in the style of skateboarding.

=== Backyard pool skating ===
From 1976 to 1977, Southern California experienced a major drought that contributed to the 1st and 4th driest years in Californian history. In an effort to conserve water, neighborhood homes were draining their backyard swimming pools, leaving empty bowls of smooth concrete. The Z-boys took advantage of the sloping walls of the pools to push the boundary of innovation when it came to aerial skateboarding. Craig Stecyk's photographs of the Z-Boys' aerial maneuvers appeared in Skateboarder, under a series titled "Dogtown Articles"; Stecyk's collections aided in the spike of skateboarding popularity in the late 20th century.

=== Later years ===
Following the success of the "Dogtown Articles", the Z-Boys witnessed an exponential rise in public popularity. Due to growing interest from rival companies, many Z-Boys left in favor of more lucrative sponsorships. By the end of 1976, the Zephyr Competition Team had ceased to exist. While the existence of the Zephyr team was short-lived, the Z-Boys are still widely regarded as the most influential team in skateboarding history.

== Members ==
=== Original members ===
- Jay Adams
- Tony Alva
- Bob Biniak
- Chris Cahill
- Paul Constantineau
- Shogo Kubo
- Jim Muir
- Peggy Oki
- Stacy Peralta
- Nathan Pratt
- Wentzle Ruml
- Allen Sarlo

=== Later members ===
- Paul Cullen
- Ho Yun
- Cris Dawson
- Jose Galan
- Dennis Harney
- Paul Hoffman
- Donnie Olham
- Tommy Waller

== Skateboarding Hall of Fame ==
In 2009, Tony Alva was inducted into the Skateboarding Hall of Fame.

Stacy Peralta was inducted into the same in 2010.

In 2012, Peggy Oki and Jay Adams were inducted.

2014 saw Jim Muir getting inducted into the Skateboarding Hall of Fame.

In 2017, Shogo Kubo was inducted.

In 2019, Cris Dawson was inducted into the same.

In 2020, was the year that Bob Biniak got inducted into the Skateboarding Hall of Fame.

In 2023, Wentzle Ruml and Paul Constantineau were inducted.

== Representation in media ==
- Lords of Dogtown
- Dogtown and Z-Boys
