= Glen E. Friedman =

American photographer and artist

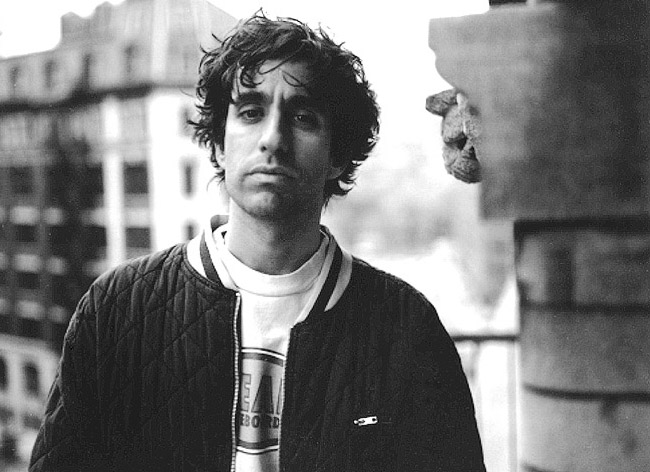
- Born: Glen Ellis Friedman; March 3, 1962 (age 64); North Carolina, United States
- Known for: Photography

Glen Ellis Friedman (born March 3, 1962) is an American photographer and artist. He became known for his activities within rebellious skateboarding and music cultures. Photographing artists Fugazi, Black Flag, Dead Kennedys, Circle Jerks, Minor Threat, Misfits, Bad Brains, Beastie Boys, Suicidal Tendencies, Slayer, Run-DMC, KRS-One, and Public Enemy, as well as classic skateboarding originators Tony Alva, Jay Adams, Alan Gelfand, Duane Peters, and Stacy Peralta, among others.

Friedman's photography has been published in over a dozen of his books as well as in many other publications, including record covers, and has been exhibited in art galleries and museums internationally. His work is held in various photography collections including the Metropolitan Museum of Art in New York City.

== Early life ==
As a pre-teen Friedman rode skateboards in the embanked schoolyards of West Los Angeles along with others who would revolutionize the activity. In late 1976, while he was still in junior high school, Friedman corralled some of his friends, who were beginning to be featured in magazines, into riding in an empty swimming pool so he could make pictures. He showed the results to a freelance SkateBoarder writer, who put Friedman in touch with the editor. SkateBoarder published photographs by Friedman as a full-page subscription advertisement. He soon after became their youngest staff member.

== Career ==
Several years later Friedman began to photograph at punk shows. Black Flag received some of their first media documentation through Friedman's work. In 1981, he photographed his first record album cover, Adolescents by Adolescents. As well as many other punk record covers including Minor Threat's Salad Days EP. Friedman's self-published punk zine, My Rules: Photozine (1982), sold 10,000 copies and was the largest selling zine of the era.

Friedman managed punk band Suicidal Tendencies and in 1983 produced their eponymous debut album.

In 1985, Friedman was introduced to Rick Rubin and Russell Simmons, after creating some memorable Beastie Boys photos, before they were widely known. Friedman began working with them and their newly formed Def Jam Records. Over the years promoting Beastie Boys, LL Cool J, Public Enemy, Ice-T and Run-DMC. He also photographed many of their album covers and publicity materials, including the covers of Public Enemy's It Takes a Nation of Millions to Hold Us Back, and Beastie Boys' Check Your Head. Many of his photographs have become recognized as the subjects' definitive portraits. In 1987 he relocated back to New York.

Friedman has collaborated with artist Shepard Fairey, many times, including limited edition prints based on Friedman's photographs.

In 2004, Friedman created the "Liberty Street Protest" at Ground Zero in New York City. Its provocative anti-war sentiment received attention internationally. It was "re-visited" in 2010 in support of Freedom of Religion, and the placement of a mosque a few blocks away from Ground Zero in New York City.

In 2012, Friedman was inducted as an "Icon" into the Skateboarding Hall of Fame.

== Personal life ==
Friedman is a progressive political activist, shuns intoxicants (straight edge), and follows a vegan diet. He lives in New York City.

== Publications ==
- My Rules: Photozine. Self-published, 1982.
- Fuck You Heroes: Glen E. Friedman photographs 1976–1991. Self-published / Burning Flags, 1994. ISBN 0-9641916-0-1. With an introduction by C.R. Stecyk III. A collection of his better-known photographs of skateboarding, punk, and hip hop subcultures spanning 1976 to 1991.
  - Fuck You Heroes: Glen E. Friedman photographs 1976–1991. Third edition. Rizzoli, 2026. ISBN 978-0789346858.
- Fuck You Too: The Extras + More Scrapbook. ConSafos, 1996. Second edition, 2005. ISBN 0-9656535-0-1. With commentary by C.R. Stecyk III and an afterword by Sam Sifton.
- The Idealist
  - The Idealist: Glen E. Friedman – In My Eyes – 20 Years. ConSafos, 1998. ISBN 978-0965653541.
  - The Idealist: Glen E. Friedman – In My Eyes – 25 Years (1976–2001). Self-published / Burning Flags, 2003. ISBN 978-0-9641916-5-5.
- Dogtown: The Legend of the Z-Boys. Self-published / Burning Flags, 2000. C.R. Stecyk III and Glen E. Friedman. ISBN 0-9641916-4-4.
  - Dogtown: The Legend of the Z-Boys – Expanded edition. Akashic / Burning Flags, 2019. C.R. Stecyk III and Friedman. ISBN 1617756997.
- Recognize. Self-published / Burning Flags, 2005. ISBN 0-9641916-6-0. With a preface by Peter Lamborn Wilson.
- Keep Your Eyes Open: The Fugazi Photographs of Glen E. Friedman. Self-published / Burning Flags, 2007. ISBN 0-9641916-8-7.
  - Akashic / Burning Flags, 2019. Expanded second edition ISBN 1617757004. With an introduction by Ian F. Svenonius.
- My Rules. Rizzoli, 2014. ISBN 0847843556. A different publication than the 1982 publication of the same name.
- Together Forever: The Run-DMC and Beastie Boys Photographs of Glen E. Friedman. Rizzoli, 2019. ISBN 0847866475. With an introduction by Chris Rock.
- What I See: The Black Flag Photographs of Glen E. Friedman. Akashic / Burning Flags, 2022. First edition. ISBN 163614036X. With an introduction by Chuck Dukowski.
- Just a Minor Threat: The Minor Threat Photographs of Glen E. Friedman. Akashic / Burning Flags, 2023. First edition. ISBN 1636141366.
- Fearless Vampire Killers: The Bad Brains Photographs of Glen E. Friedman. Akashic / Burning Flags, 2025. First edition. ISBN 978-1-63614-208-1.
- We’ve Got a Bigger Problem Now: the Dead Kennedys Photographs of Glen E. Friedman. Akashic / Burning Flags, 2026. First edition. ISBN 978-1-63614-323-1.

== Films with contributions by Friedman ==
- THE FUCK YOU HEROES (2026) – director, all still photography,
- A Look Back at DogTown and Z-Boys (2021) – director, producer, cinematographer
- Dogtown and Z-Boys (2001) – co-producer and creative consultant
- No No: A Dockumentary (2014) – associate producer and creative consultant
- Saving Banksy (2017) – himself
- Obey Giant (2017) – himself

== Solo exhibitions ==
- Fuck You All, Institute of Contemporary Arts, London, 1997; Sydney, 1998; Tokyo, 1998; Rome, 1998; Florence, 1998; Milan, 1998; Berlin, 1999; Stockholm, 1999; Chicago, 1999; Washington, D.C., 2000; Philadelphia, 2000; Stockholm, 2000; Los Angeles, 2002; Antwerp, Belgium, 2007; Krakow, Poland, 2009; Dublin, 2010; San Francisco, 2010; Canary Islands, Spain, 2014.
- The Idealist, Los Angeles, 2004
- Idealist Propaganda, Subliminal Projects, Los Angeles, 2008 Retrospective exhibition.
- My Rules, ATP Gallery at 14 Henrietta St, London, November 21, 2014 – January 18, 2015.
- The Burning Flags Tour, Barcelona, Spain, 2022; Paris, France 2023; Woody Guthrie Center, Tulsa, Oklahoma, 2025

== Collections ==
Friedman's work is held in the following public collections:

- Metropolitan Museum of Art, New York, New York.
- Berkeley Art Museum and Pacific Film Archive, Berkeley, California.
- Smithsonian Institution, Photographic History Collection, National Museum of American History. Washington D.C.
- Museum of Fine Arts Houston, Houston, Texas.
- Morgan Library and Museum, New York, New York.
- Stanford University, Stanford, California.
- New York Public Library, New York, New York.
- University of California Los Angeles, Los Angeles, California.
- Emory University, Atlanta, Georgia.
- Cornell University, Ithaca, New York.
- Wolfsonian-FIU, Miami Beach, Florida.
- W.E.B. Du Bois Institute for African and African American Research, Cambridge, Massachusetts.
