= Steve Olson (skateboarder) =

American skateboarder and contemporary artist

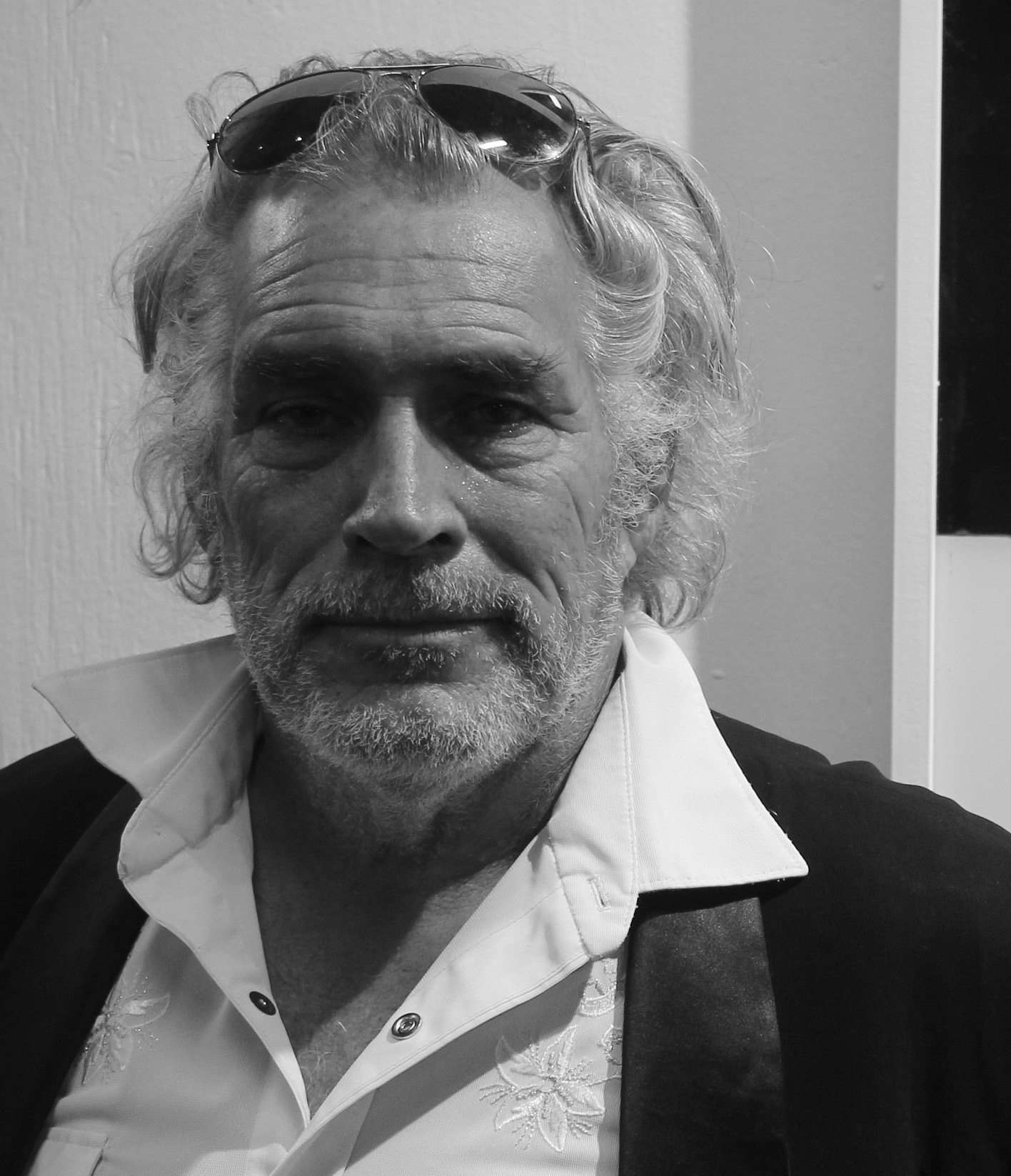
- Olson in Los Angeles (2023)
- Born: August 25, 1961 (age 64); California, U.S.
- Occupations: Skateboarder, contemporary artist
- Years active: 1966-present
- Children: Alex Olson

Steve Olson is a 1970s-1980s era American professional skateboarder and contemporary artist originally from Orange County, California.

In 1979, he was sponsored by Santa Cruz Skateboards, turning professional alongside of teammates Duane Peters and Steve Alba. Later the same year Olson would receive the Skateboarder Of The Year award.

Among his contributions to the culture, Olson is credited with first introducing the skateboarding world to Punk rock music.

In 2014, Olson was inducted into the Skateboarding Hall of Fame. Filmmaker and former professional skateboarder Stacy Peralta said of Olson's induction, “He was the first Vert skateboarding champion. He would show up to contests with the least amount of practice. But then he’d get this intense focus and would go out there and be flawless. And he never did the same thing twice.”

== Early life and career ==
Olson grew up in the town called Rossmoor, surfing and skateboarding in the Orange County area.

== Art exhibitions ==
Olson's Contemporary Modernism artworks has been featured in exhibitions at spaces including; Medium Exchange Gallery (New York), Diane Rosenstein Gallery (Los Angeles), Bowman Gallery (Beverly Hills), and the Known Gallery (Los Angeles).

In 2015, some of his more controversial pieces such as "Buy Sexual" (2002) were censured from appearing at a public exhibition in Santa Barbara, California and were physically removed after they had already been installed.

In July 2023, Olson participated as a special guest artist in the Los Angeles art and music collective Surf Skate Roots Rock, reuniting with fellow skateboarding pioneers such as Tony Alva, Lance Mountain, Lonnie Toft, etc.
