= Pacific Ocean Park =

1958-1967 amusement park in California

- Vintage postcard circa 1959 showing the entrance plaza of Pacific Ocean Park
- Interactive map of Pacific Ocean Park
- Location: Santa Monica, California, US
- Coordinates: 33.998°N 118.482°W
- Status: Defunct
- Opened: 26 July 1958
- Closed: 6 October 1967

Pacific Ocean Park was a 28-acre (11-hectare) nautical-themed amusement park built on a pier at Pier Avenue in the Ocean Park section of Santa Monica, California, in 1958. Intended to compete with Disneyland, it replaced Ocean Park Pier (1926–1956). After it closed and fell into disrepair, the park and pier anchored the Dogtown area of Santa Monica.

== History ==
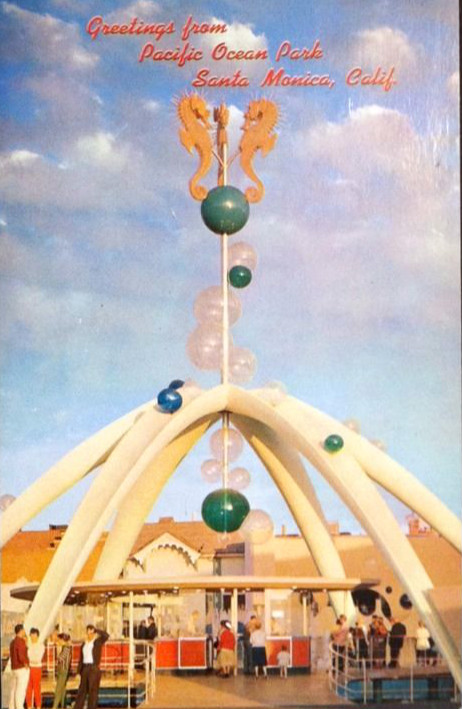
Entrance Pacific Ocean Park

Pacific Ocean Park was a joint venture between CBS and Santa Anita Park. It opened on Saturday, July 28, 1958, with an attendance of 20,000. The next day, it drew 37,262, outperforming Disneyland's attendance that day. Admission was 90 cents for adults, which included access to the park and certain exhibits. It was locally known by the acronym POP ("pee-oh-pee"). It was also marketed as "Pay One Price", though other rides and attractions were on a pay-per-use basis.

Like Disneyland, it found corporate sponsors to share the expense of some exhibits. Six of the pier's original attractions were incorporated into the new park, including the Sea Serpent roller coaster, the antique Looff carousel, the Toonerville Fun House, the Glass House and the twin diving bells.

== Attractions ==
Among a standard complement of carnival-style attractions and rides were:

- Westinghouse Enchanted Forest/USS Nautilus Submarine Exhibit featuring a 150-foot (46 m)-long model of the atomic reactor section of a submarine
- House of Tomorrow, themed like similar "looks at the future" at Disneyland's Tomorrowland and the World's Fair. Elektro, the talking and smoking robot from the 1939 World's Fair, was a prominent display.
- Sea Circus was included in the basic entrance price. Performing dolphins and sea lions played to audiences of 2,000. After shows, visitors could feed seals in the Seal Pool.

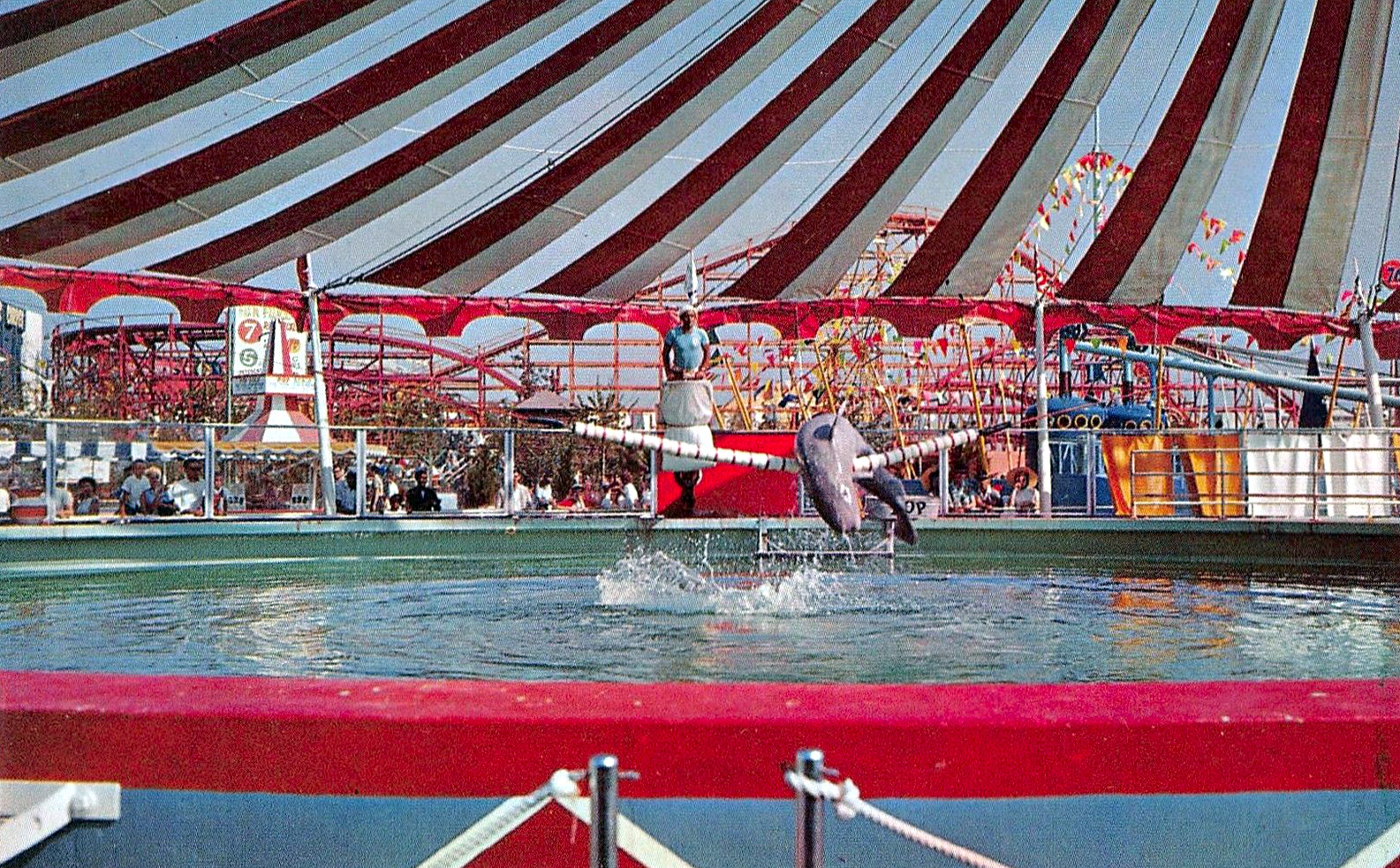
The Sea Circus Pacific Ocean Park

- Diving Bells, where passengers were submerged underwater in dual diving bells operated via hydraulic pistons. An underwater view of the tank was visible through the portholes. (Similar rides also existed in single fashion at the Long Beach Nu-Pike and Coney Island's Astroland.) The ride's thrill occurred when the bell was allowed to surface. When the hydraulic pressure holding the bell down was released, they shot back up to the surface in dramatic fashion. The ride was manufactured by Martine.

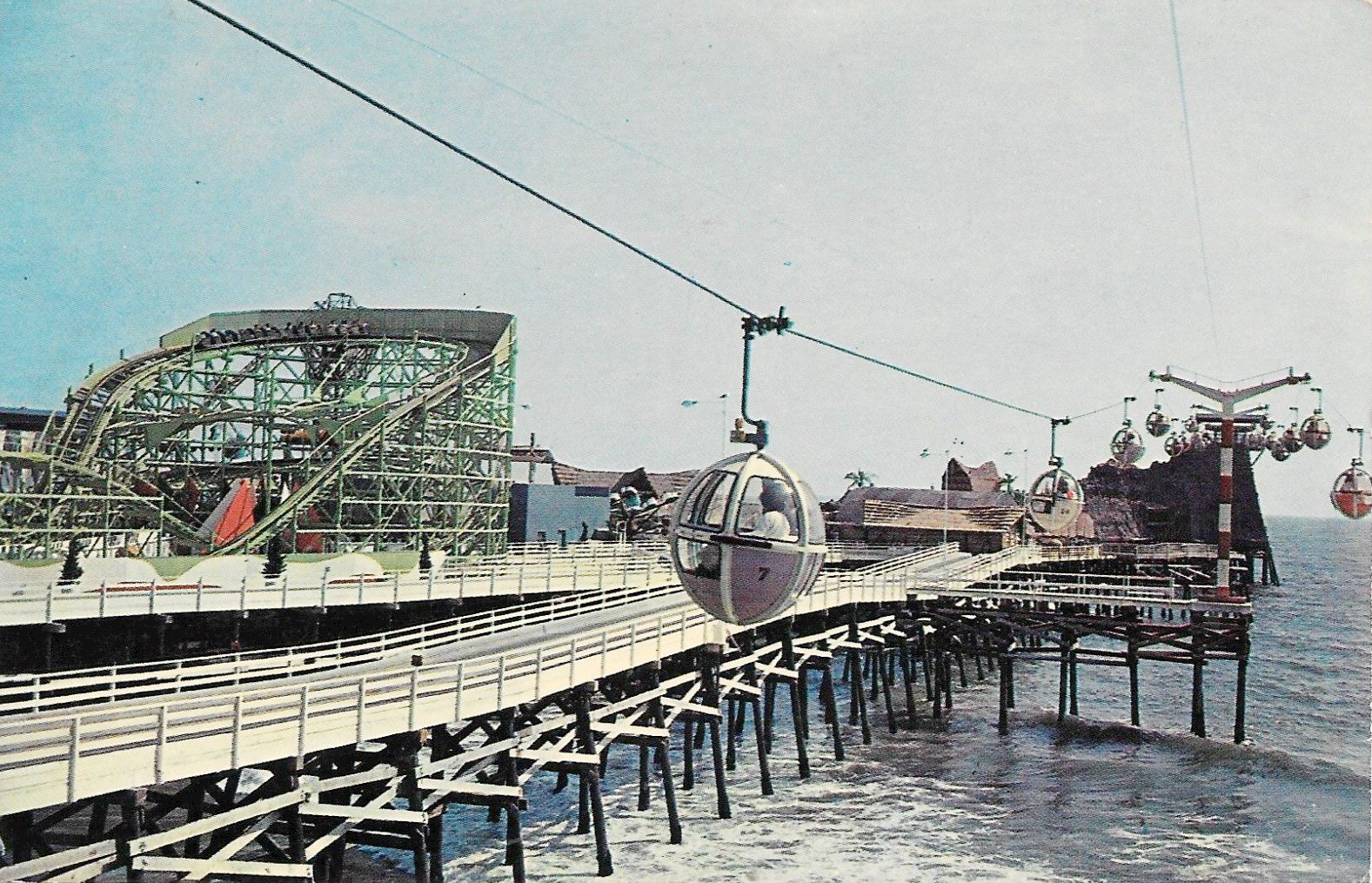
Sky Ride Pacific Ocean Park

- Ocean Skyway, built by Von Roll, consisted of bubble-shaped gondolas suspended 75 feet (23 m) above the surface of the ocean. Passengers were treated to a half-mile (800 m) trip out to sea and back.
- Union 76 Ocean Highway, similar to Disneyland's Autopia attraction, where visitors drove miniature gasoline-powered automobiles on a simulated highway.
- Flight to Mars, an audiovisual presentation that simulated a trip to Mars
- Flying Carpet, a ride themed around the One Thousand and One Nights folk tales. "Flying carpets" suspended on an overhead track took visitors over an Arabian-themed diorama.
- Mirror Maze, a standard funhouse attraction.
- Davy Jones' Locker, another funhouse with a nautical theme

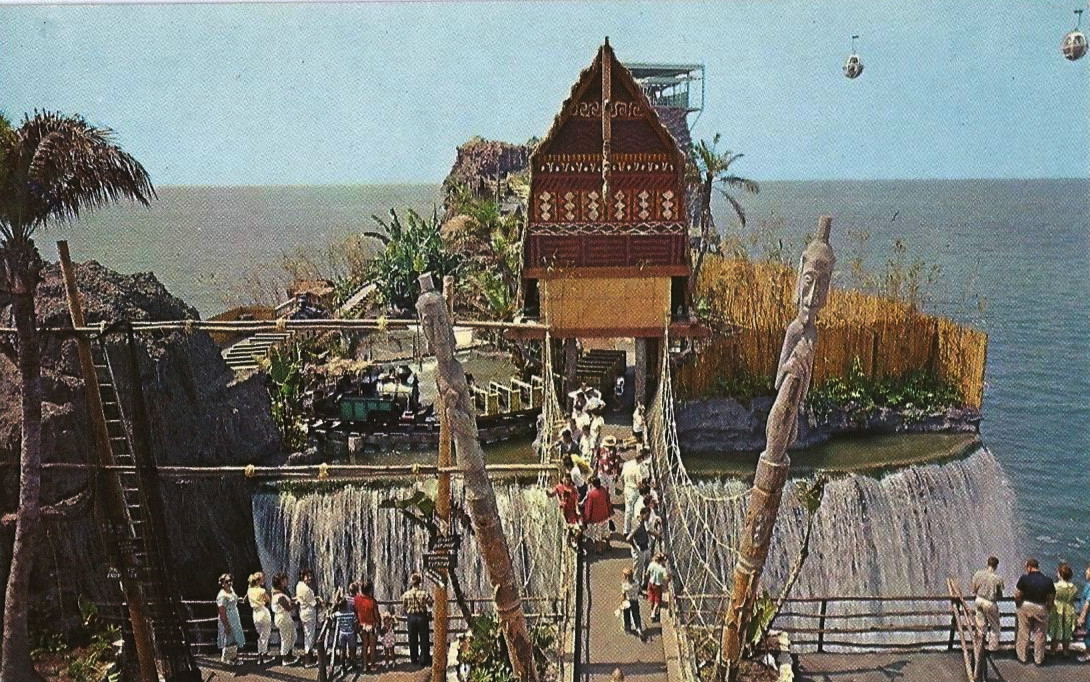
View of Mystery Island

- Flying Dutchman, a dark ride similar in theme to Disneyland's Pirates of the Caribbean, but without animatronic figures
- Deepest Deep, a simulated submarine voyage. Unlike Disneyland's Submarine Voyage attraction, Deepest Deep took place above water.
- Round the World in 80 Turns was an unusual combination of travelogue and thrill ride. Tub-like ride vehicles whipped sharply to the right and left to show travel scenes from around the world. The attraction was closed during the middle of the park's second season following customer complaints of nausea and neck and back pain.
- Safari Dark Ride was an interactive children's ride where riders in miniature Jeeps used an electronic rifle to "hunt" animals in the African jungle.
- Mystery Island Banana Train Ride was considered by many the park's best ride. Passengers took a trip aboard a tropical banana plantation train, complete with a simulated volcano and simulated earthquakes.
- Sea Serpent Roller Coaster, the wooden 1926 Hi-Boy rollercoaster from the original pier.

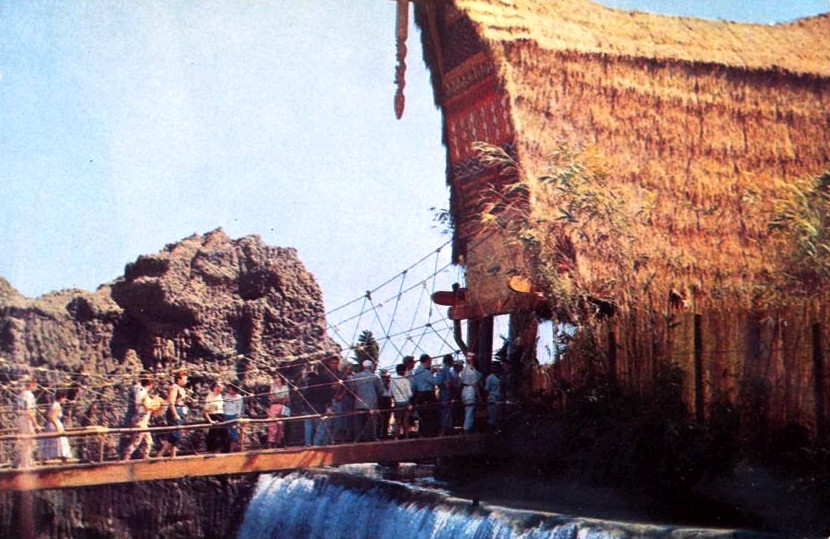
Gangplank to Mystery Island Banana Train attraction

- Mahi Mahi, a massive Stantzel Strat-O-Liner tower with rotating arms ending in jet-style cars, each of which held eight passengers. Six of these rides were manufactured, but none exist today.
- Whirl Pool, a centrifuge that pinned riders to its walls as the floor slowly lowered beneath them.
- Mr. Dolphin, another original pier attraction
- Flying Fish, a miniature rollercoaster made by Carlos and Ramigosi, the first steel Wild Mouse roller coaster in the U.S.

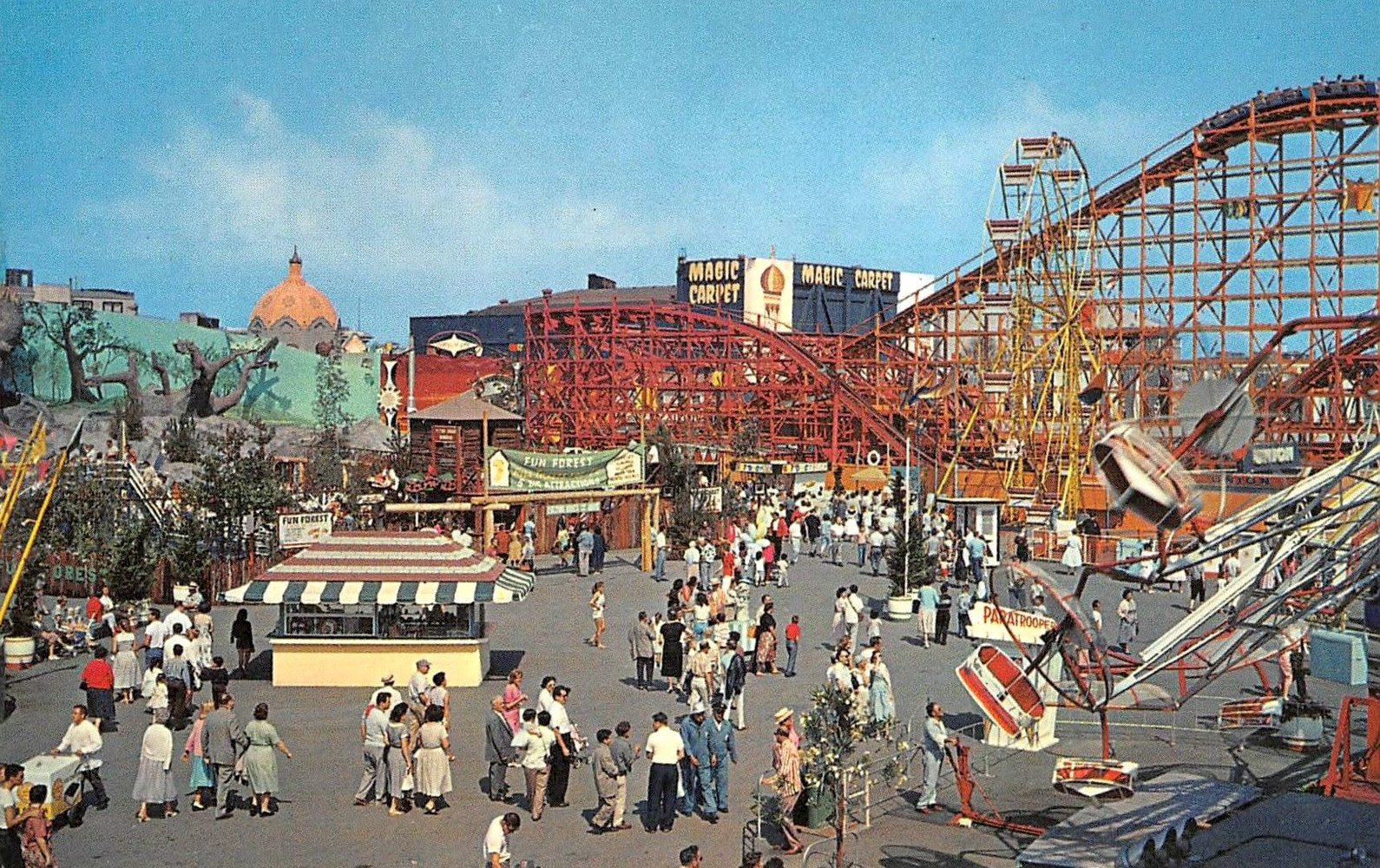
The Midway at Pacific Ocean Park

- Carousel, the 1926-vintage Looff carousel from the original pier
- Fisherman's Cove and the International Promenade, shopping, dining and souvenir areas with a number of international restaurants
- King Neptune's Courtyard, a colorful walk under the ocean to view King Neptune's lair
- Mrs. Squid, also known as the Ahuna Thrill Ride, an Eyerly Octopus ride with a squid decor in the center and 16 tubs, each carrying two passengers
- Mr. Octopus, a standard Eyerly Octopus ride with eight tubs
- Space Wheels, a unique pair of double Ferris wheels manufactured by Velare Brothers. The attraction still exists and is owned by Drew Exposition of Georgia.
- Fun Forest, a children's area with mazes and slides as well as helicopter, boat, monorail and covered-wagon rides

By January 5, 1959, POP had attracted 1,190,000 visitors. Although plans were made to add four new attractions, only two were completed, at a cost of $2,000,000: Space Wheels and Fun Forest.

== Film location ==
The park was used as a filming location for television shows such as Route 66 (TV series) ("Between Hello and Goodbye", 1962), The Millionaire ("The Jeff Mercer Story", 1959), The Fugitive, Get Smart (1968), The Twilight Zone, The Invaders (1968), The Mod Squad, and films such as Woman on the Run (1950), Gun Crazy (1950), Vicki (1953), The Chapman Report (1962) and Hold On! (1966).

The Miss Teen USA beauty pageant was held at the park in 1962, with the winner, Linda Henning, 15, of Sioux Falls, South Dakota crowned by television comedian Soupy Sales.

== Decline ==
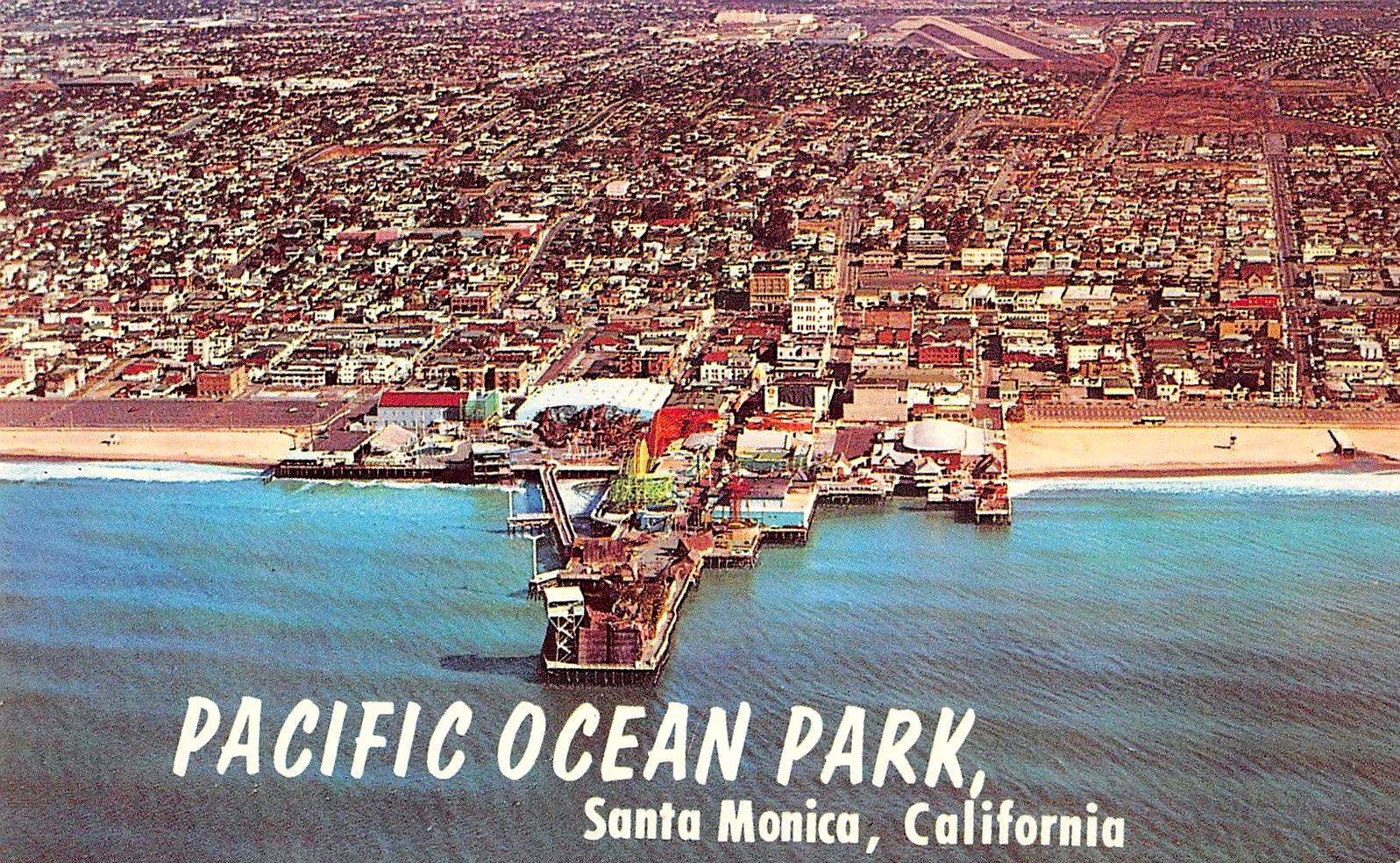
Aerial view of Pacific Ocean Park

In 1965, Santa Monica began the Ocean Park urban renewal project. Buildings in the surrounding area were demolished and streets leading to the park were closed. As a result, visitors found it difficult to reach the park, and attendance plummeted to 621,000 in 1965 and 398,700 in 1966.

At the end of the 1967 tourist season, the park's creditors and the City of Santa Monica filed suit to take control of the property because of back taxes and back rent owed by the park's new owner since 1965. The park closed on October 6, 1967, and its assets were auctioned off from June 28–30, 1968. The proceeds from the sale of 36 rides and 16 games were used to pay off creditors. The ruins of the pier became a favorite surfing area and hangout of the Z-Boys of Dogtown fame. The park's dilapidated buildings and pier structure remained until several suspicious fires occurred on:

- May 27, 1970
- August 29, 1971
- March 17, 1973

Pacific Ocean Park was finally demolished starting in October 1974 and ending in February 1975. Other than a few underwater pilings and signs warning of them, nothing remains of Pacific Ocean Park today. A few miles north, the original Santa Monica Pier features a newer amusement park, similarly called Pacific Park.
