= Jay Adams =

American skateboarder (1961–2014)

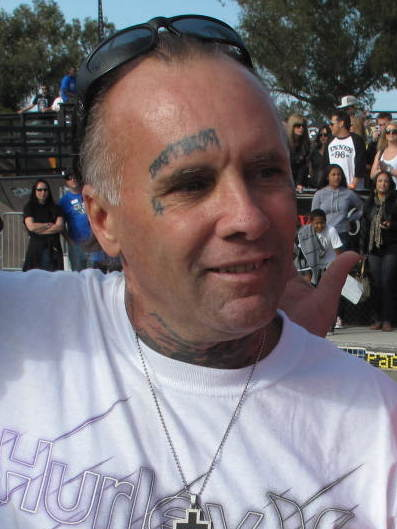
- Adams in 2011

Personal information
- Full name: Jay J. Adams
- Born: February 3, 1961 Los Angeles, California, U.S.
- Died: August 15, 2014 (aged 53) San Pedro Mixtepec, Oaxaca, Mexico
- Occupation: Skateboarder

Jay J. Adams (February 3, 1961 – August 15, 2014) was an American skateboarder. As a teen, he was the youngest member of the Zephyr Competition Skateboarding Team (Z-Boys). His spontaneous freestyle skateboarding style, inspired by ocean surfing, helped innovate and popularize modern skateboarding. His aggressive vertical tricks make him one of skateboarding's most influential stylists. He has been called "the original seed" of skateboarding.

== Early life ==
Adams was born on February 3, 1961, in the Venice neighborhood of Los Angeles, California. He was the only child of Robert Adams and Philaine Herring, and grew up with his mother and his stepfather, Kent Sherwood. He began skating and surfing at the age of four. Sherwood worked at Dave Sweet's Surf Shop under Pacific Ocean Park, where Adams was introduced to skateboarding. Adams' skateboarding was greatly influenced by Larry Bertlemann, a professional surfer known for dragging his hands along the waves as he rode them.

In 1974, at age 13, Adams became the youngest member to join the Santa Monica-based Zephyr surf team representing Jeff Ho Surfboards and Zephyr Productions. Fellow Z-Boy Tony Alva said of Adams, "Some kids are born and raised on graham crackers and milk; he was born and raised on surfing and skateboarding."

== Career ==
The Z-Boys became a skate team when they heard about the Bahne-Cadillac Del Mar Nationals in 1975. Adams was the first member to enter the competition, held in Del Mar, California, taking second place in the Junior Men's Freestyle. His explosive energy and low, bold, surf-like moves characterized the style of the Z-Boys and contrasted with the traditional style of the era, which was still based around gymnastic-style tricks formulated in the 1960s. Adams' ability to turn near-disasters into never-before-seen feats of style and agility was termed "an athletic stream-of-consciousness" by the 2001 documentary about the team, Dogtown and Z-Boys.

Much of Adams' and the rest of the Zephyr team's fame is due to photojournalist and writer Craig Stecyk's "Dogtown Chronicles" in the 1975 relaunch of Skateboarder. The series of magazine articles chronicled the adventures of the Z-Boys, who rode empty swimming pools in Southern California over a two-year period, laying the foundation for vertical skateboarding. The international reach of Stecyk's Dogtown articles and skateboard-industry sponsorship led to skateboarding becoming a viable profession. By age 15, Adams was one of the first skateboarders shown "catching air" (time spent in the air after launching) above the edge of a swimming pool.

The Zephyr team broke up shortly after the Del Mar Nationals. Half the team formed a new team under Adams' stepfather Kent Sherwood, who made the Zephyr boards. Sherwood and Adams created the brand and team EZ-RYDER, which changed its name to Z-Flex six months later. Adams was the face of the brand.

During his skateboarding career, Adams was sponsored by Hurley, Nixon, Osiris Shoes, Z-Flex, Tracker Trucks, Vercelli Surfboards, Carver Racks, Abec 11 Wheels, and Black Flys. Along with Jef Hartsel, Adams would go on to revive EZ-RYDER as EZ Ryder Originalz, custom designing and testing their handcrafted equipment. He collaborated with Z-Flex, designing boards in the Z-Flex range, most notably the Z-Flex Jay Adams Cruiser Skateboard.

According to former Z-Boys teammate Stacy Peralta, Adams "is probably not the greatest skater of all time, but I can say without fear of being wrong that he is clearly the archetype of modern-day skateboarding."

Adams was inducted into the Skateboarding Hall of Fame in 2012.

== Films ==
Adams is featured prominently in the 2001 Peralta-directed documentary Dogtown and Z-Boys. Los Angeles Times critic Kenneth Turan noted his contribution to the film: "Dogtown is at its dramatic best with mini-profiles of its two biggest names, Adams and Tony Alva. The Adams segment especially, which shows the most naturally gifted of the Z-Boys regretful about the bad choices he made in his life, provides the kind of thoughtful introspection this film could have used a lot more of." The documentary won awards at Sundance and an Independent Spirit Award.

Adams was portrayed by Emile Hirsch in the 2005 dramatized feature-film account of the Z-Boys origins, Lords of Dogtown, written by Peralta and directed by Catherine Hardwicke. He was also featured in Joshua Pomer's 2010 surf documentary The Westsiders.

== Personal life ==
=== Legal troubles and personal struggles ===
Adams spent time in prisons as he struggled with drug addiction. After a Suicidal Tendencies concert in 1982, Adams screamed slurs at a gay couple outside a popular Hollywood hangout. When one of them yelled back, he knocked him down. Adams claimed he fled but that the crowd behind him closed in and kicked and beat the men, killing one of them. He was convicted of felony assault and sentenced to six months in relation to the death of Dan Bradbury.

In the late 1990s, after the murder of his brother and the death of his mother, father, and grandmother all in the same year, Adams began using heroin. He was serving two and a half years on drug charges in Hawaii during the production of Dogtown and Z-Boys and was released in 2002. The movie brought Adams back into the limelight and led to endorsement deals for him.

As of 2005, Adams claimed to be drug-free and spoke to children at local schools about his past struggles. Nonetheless, in November 2005, he was arrested and sentenced to four years, after being caught on a wiretap acting as a go-between for a buyer and seller of methamphetamine. He was released to a halfway house on July 8, 2008, for the remainder of his sentence. He completed his probation in January 2014.

=== Family ===
Adams' first wife was Alisha Adams, with whom he had a daughter, Venice. He also had a son, Seven, with ex-girlfriend Samantha Baglioni.

Adams married Tracy Adams in 2011. They most recently resided in San Clemente, California, where Adams was an active member at a local church.

== Death ==
Adams died of a heart attack on August 15, 2014, in Puerto Escondido, a tourist resort town in the San Pedro Mixtepec municipality of Oaxaca, Mexico. A memorial funeral service was held in his honor at Venice Beach, California, on August 30, 2014. Surfers and skateboarders from across the country showed their respect by taking part in a traditional Hawaiian-style paddle-out tribute. A memorial skate session was held for Adams at the Venice Beach Skatepark by fellow skateboarders Tony Alva and Christian Hosoi.

Two Venice-area murals have commemorated Adams. One is on the building site of the original Zephyr Skate Shop in Santa Monica. Shortly after his death, there was another on the surface of Venice Skatepark's bowl, featuring Adams alongside fellow Dogtown skater, the late Shogo Kubo, which has since been removed.
