= Tony Alva =

American skateboarder and entrepreneur (born 1957)

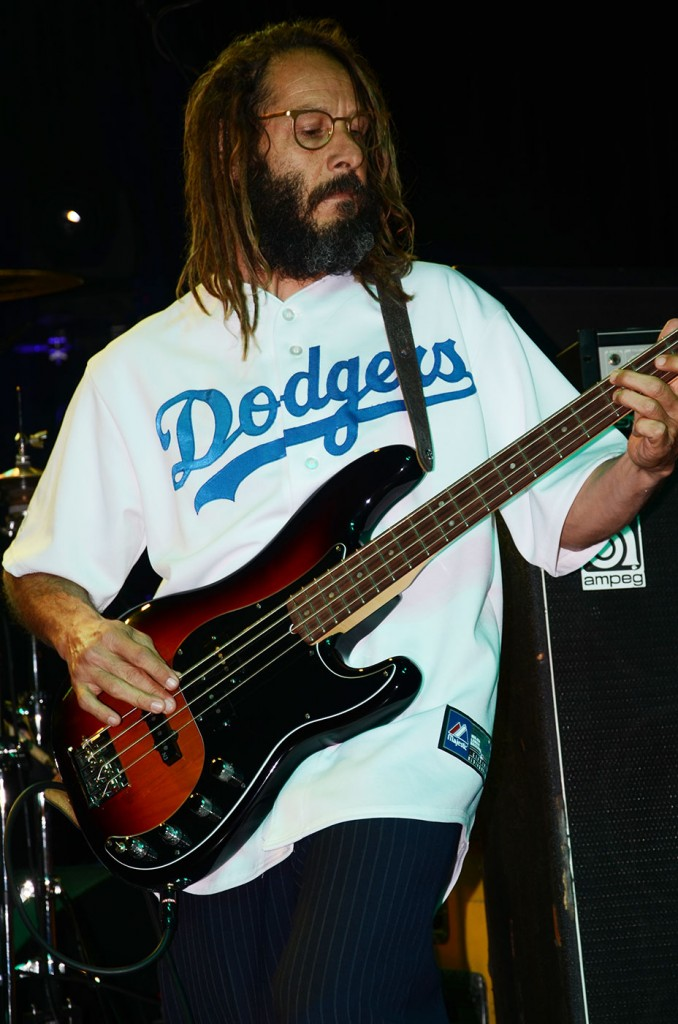
- Alva in 2012
- Born: September 2, 1957 (age 69); Santa Monica, California, U.S.
- Occupations: Skateboarder, entrepreneur, musician
- Years active: 1967–present
- Partner: Katy Rodriguez (since 2002)
- Website: alva-skates.com

Tony Alva (born September 2, 1957) is an American skateboarder, entrepreneur, and musician. He is a pioneer of vertical skateboarding and one of the original members of the Zephyr Competition Skateboarding Team, also known as the Z-boys. Transworld Skateboarding Magazine ranked him eighth in its list of the "30 Most Influential skateboarders" of all time.

== Early life ==
Tony Alva was born September 2, 1957, in Santa Monica, California, to Dutch and Mexican-American parents. He first began surfing and skateboarding around 1967 at the age of 10.

== Career ==
Influenced by the new, aggressive surfing style happening on the Hawaiian Islands, Alva brought a radically new free form surf style to skateboarding. Alva's style stood in stark contrast with the contrived traditional style of the era, which was still based on tricks formulated in the 1960s. His skill, style and charismatic nature led him to become a professionally sponsored skateboarder.

In 1974, he joined the Zephyr Skateboard team along with Jay Adams and Stacy Peralta. Alva and the other Z-Boys (also all surfers), were among the first to bring the dangerous art of skating empty swimming pools into the mainstream. Alva is considered an originator of vertical skating and is credited as the first skateboarder to successfully pull a Frontside Air. That moment, captured on film by photographer Glen E. Friedman, is considered by many to be the birth of modern skateboarding.

Alongside professional skaters Arto Saari, Brandon Biebel, and Stevie Williams, Alva completed a photo and video shoot for Playboy magazine, that was shot by Irish photographer Tony Kelly. The 2013 shoot is entitled "Playboy Poolside" and features the four subjects skateboarding in and around an empty swimming pool.

=== Business ventures ===
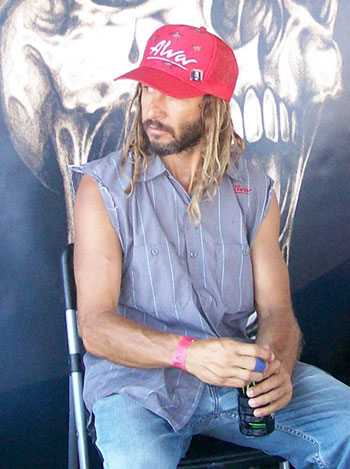
Alva, c. 2000s

Alva started his long relationship working with Vans in 1974, helping to design the off-the-wall skateboard shoe, the original skate shoe. Alva's father had been buying Vans shoes for his kids since they were young. Vans was established in 1966 and was the shoe of choice for the Santa Monica youth culture.

In 1977, at the age of 19, Alva shunned the major skate companies to form his own company, entitled Alva Skates. It was the first company run and owned by a skateboarder, as well as being one of the first to use layered Canadian maple plywood in skateboard decks. In December 2005, Alva opened two retail stores in Southern California located in Oceanside, near San Diego, and on Fairfax Avenue in Los Angeles.

In December 2006, he celebrated the first anniversary of the stores with a party at the Los Angeles shop, which was attended by some of the old Z-Boys, current Alva Team members, skate fans, and other minor celebrities. Alva signed autographs and served as the DJ for the catered event. The "bad boy" image of the Z-Boy was reiterated in the postcard invitation for the event, which featured a profane drawing.

Alva pioneered the first Rip Grip product, a material that could stick onto the underside of a skateboarder's deck, making it easier to maintain grip.

Alva signed a three-year deal with Vans shoes and his pro model high-top was released in 2006.

== Music ==
In the early 1980s, Alva played bass guitar for the "Skoundrelz", a Venice, California punk band. Three songs appeared on BCT's First Strike compilation released in 1983. Later, Alva was in an early line-up of sleaze rock band Junkyard. In 2007, he formed the band G.F.P. (General Fucking Principle) with Dead Fucking Last vocalist Tom Paul Davis (Crazy Tom), guitarist Greg Hetson (Circle Jerks, Bad Religion) and former Suicidal Tendencies drummer Amery Smith. In 2013, Alva began playing with Los Angeles rock band, His Eyes Have Fangs.

In July 2023, His Eyes Have Fangs participated as a special musical guest at the Los Angeles art and music collective Surf Skate Roots Rock, reuniting with fellow skateboarding-artist pioneers such as Lance Mountain, Lonnie Toft, Mike Smith, Marty Grimes, George Wilson, Steve Olson, etc.

== Media appearances ==
Tony Alva was featured in the music video Unenslaved for the band Excel (band) in 1995. Which appeared on their album Seeking Refuge. Tony Alva is featured in the 2001 documentary on Santa Monica and Venice Beach skate culture Dogtown and Z-Boys, which was fictionalized into the 2005 feature film Lords of Dogtown. He also played the role of Tony Bluetile in the 1978 film Skateboard: The Movie. He also played 'T.A.', a member of the bad boy skaters in the 1986 film Thrashin' and served as skate technical advisor. In 2007, he made a guest appearance in Meck's music video for "Feels Like Home". Alva makes an appearance in the 2012 documentary Bones Brigade: An Autobiography, directed by Stacy Peralta. In 2012, Alva appeared on an episode of the A&E reality series, Storage Wars to appraise a skateboard. Alva was featured in the 2005 skateboarding video game Tony Hawk's American Wasteland. He is seen on the cover of the album The Action Is Go by stoner rock band Fu Manchu. Alva also featured in the 1978 documentary "Skateboard Kings" produced by director Horace Ové.

== Awards ==
1975 USSA World Invitational Skateboard Champion. Alva was voted "Skateboarder of the Year" in Skateboarder Magazine's readers poll and he set the Guinness World Record for barrel jumping.

== Bibliography ==
- Friedman, Glen E.; Stecyk, C.R. (2000). Dog Town – The Legend of The Z-Boys. New York City: Burning Flags Press. ISBN 0-9641916-4-4.
- Friedman, Glen E. (1994). Fuck You Heroes (Photographs 1976–1991). New York City: Burning Flags Press. ISBN 0-9641916-0-1.
- Brooke, Michael (1999). "Appendix C: Skateboard Competitions (1963–1993)". The Concrete Wave. Toronto: Warwick Publishing. ISBN 1-894020-54-5.
