= Dogtown and Z-Boys =

2001 documentary film by Stacy Peralta

- Theatrical release poster
- Directed by: Stacy Peralta
- Written by: Stacy Peralta; Craig Stecyk
- Produced by: Agi Orsi; Daniel Ostroff; Stephen Nemeth
- Narrated by: Sean Penn
- Cinematography: Peter Pilafian
- Edited by: Paul Crowder
- Distributed by: Sony Pictures Classics
- Release dates: January 19, 2001 (Sundance Film Festival); April 26, 2002 (United States)
- Running time: 91 minutes
- Country: United States
- Language: English
- Budget: $400,000
- Box office: $1.5 million

Dogtown and Z-Boys is a 2001 American documentary film co-written and directed by Stacy Peralta, produced by Agi Orsi, and narrated by Sean Penn. The documentary explores the pioneering of the Zephyr skateboard team in the 1970s (of which Peralta was a member) and the evolving sport of skateboarding. Using a mix of film of the Zephyr skateboard team (Z-Boys) shot in the 1970s by Craig Stecyk, along with contemporary interviews, the documentary tells the story of a group of teenage surfer/skateboarders and their influence on the history of skateboarding (and to a lesser extent surfing) culture.

== Synopsis ==
Dogtown and Z-Boys, narrated by Sean Penn, begins with the history of skateboarding in Southern California and how it had been strongly influenced by the surf culture in the surrounding areas of Santa Monica and Venice, nicknamed Dogtown. Surf shop owners Jeff Ho, Skip Engblom, and Craig Stecyk established the Zephyr Skateboard Team with local teenagers from broken homes. The sport of skateboarding evolved as the Z-Boys continued to bring edgy moves influenced by surfing. During one of California's record-breaking droughts, local backyard pools were emptied and became hotspots for these young skateboarders looking for places to skateboard. The members of the Zephyr team gained notoriety and national attention when they competed in skateboard championships and started to receive media attention for their skills as young athletes. Testimonials and commentary provided by the members and founders of the Zephyr team combined with the rock-and-roll soundtrack and vintage footage all come together in this documentary about the history and lives of the original Z-Boys and skateboarding subculture of California.

== Cast ==
The documentary includes footage, commentary, and interviews from eleven of the original members of the Z-Boys team, along with the team's co-founders, skateboarding champions, and other relevant skateboarding figures, journalists, and musicians from the era.

- Sean Penn as the narrator
- Jay Adams (Zephyr Skate Team member) as himself
- Tony Alva (Zephyr Skate Team member) as himself
- Stacy Peralta (Zephyr Skate Team member) as himself
- Jeff Ament as himself
- Steve Caballero as himself
- Skip Engblom (Zephyr Co-Founder) as himself
- Craig Stecyk (Zephyr Co-Founder) as himself
- Tony Hawk as himself
- Henry Rollins as himself
- Tom Sims as himself
- Peggy Oki (Zephyr Skate Team member) as herself
- Jeff Ho (Zephyr Co-Founder) as himself

== Production ==
The documentary features vintage video footage and photos of the Zephyr skateboard team from the 1970s, along with contemporary interviews from the original members of the Z-Boys group. The film combines the 8-mm and 16-mm vintage footage with modern editing and a soundtrack crafted from music of the 1970s era.

Dogtown and Z-Boys was directed by Stacy Peralta, an original member of the Zephyr team, and written by Peralta and Craig Stecyk, a leading surf and skateboard film producer and photojournalist.

The film operated on a budget of $400,000 financed by Vans, Inc. Stecyk and photojournalist Glen E. Friedman, were the film's co-writer and co-producer, respectively, Daniel Ostroff and Stephen Nemeth were also co-producers, and Debra MacCulloch and Christine Triano were associate producers involved with the film.

== Release ==
Dogtown and Z-Boys debuted at the 2001 Sundance Film Festival where it won two awards: the Audience Award and Directing Award.

The film opened April 26, 2002 in 20 theaters in Los Angeles, New York, and Phoenix.

== Reception ==
The film also won the Independent Spirit Award for Best Documentary in 2001.

The film was well received by many critics, including reporter Steve McKee of The Wall Street Journal who stated that the documentary had opened with "boffo reviews" from around the country. The film received a rating of 92% on Rotten Tomatoes and a generally favorable rating of 76 on Metacritic. Stephen Holden of The New York Times said the film was a "giddy, thrilling, rock 'n' roll-saturated history of skateboarding in Southern California."

On the opening weekend, Dogtown and Z-Boys grossed $103,355. The film went on to gross $1,300,682 in the United States and Canada and $1,523,090 worldwide. According to Peralta in a 2004 interview, "Dogtown has sold over a million DVDs and more than 700,000 VHS."

== Music ==
- Aerosmith – "Seasons of Wither"
- Aerosmith – "Toys in the Attic"
- Alice Cooper – "Billion Dollar Baby"
- Alice Cooper – "Generation Landslide"
- The Allman Brothers Band – "One Way Out"
- Black Sabbath – "Into the Void"
- Black Sabbath – "Paranoid"
- Blue Öyster Cult – "Godzilla"
- Buzzcocks – "Fast Cars"
- Buzzcocks – "Boredom"
- David Bowie – "Aladdin Sane"
- David Bowie – "Rebel Rebel"
- Devo – "Gut Feeling"
- Emilio Pericoli – "Volare"
- Fila Brazillia – "Subtle Body"
- Fila Brazillia – "Harmonicas are Shite"
- Herb Alpert – "A Taste of Honey"
- Herb Alpert – "Lollipops and Roses"
- James Gang – "Funk 49"
- Jan and Dean – "Sidewalk Surfing"
- The Jimi Hendrix Experience – "Ezy Ryder"
- The Jimi Hendrix Experience – "Foxy Lady"
- The Jimi Hendrix Experience – "Freedom"
- The Jimi Hendrix Experience – "Bold as Love"
- Joe Walsh – "Rocky Mountain Way"
- Led Zeppelin – "Achilles Last Stand"
- Led Zeppelin – "Hots On for Nowhere"
- The Lively Ones – "Surfrider"
- Massive Attack – "Exchange"
- Neil Young – "Old Man"
- Peter Frampton – "I'll Give You Money"
- Pink Floyd – "Us and Them"
- Robin Trower – "Hannah"
- Rod Stewart – "Maggie May"
- Sneaker Pimps – "6 Underground"
- The Stooges – "Gimme Danger"
- The Stooges – "I Wanna Be Your Dog"
- T. Rex – "Children of the Revolution"
- The Pretenders – "Bad Boys Get Spanked"
- Thin Lizzy – "Bad Reputation"
- Ted Nugent – "Cat Scratch Fever"
- Ted Nugent – "Wang Dang Sweet Poontang (Live)"
- Ted Nugent – "Motor City Madhouse"
- The Trammps – "Disco Inferno"
- ZZ Top – "La Grange"

== See also ==
- Lords of Dogtown
