= Reggie Barnes (skateboarder) =

American professional skateboarder

Personal information
- Born: Reginald Barnes Jr. c. 1961 Cary, North Carolina, U.S.
- Education: Cape Fear Community College
- Employer: Eastern Skateboard Supply
- Height: 5 ft 6 in (168 cm)
- Website: www.easternskatesupply.com

Sport
- Sport: Skateboarding
- Event: Freestyle
- Team: Wizard Skate Team; Powerflex; Pepsi Pro Skateboard Team; Walker Skateboards; Dogtown Skateboards
- Turned pro: 1979
- Retired: 1991

Achievements and titles
- Personal bests: 2nd – NSA Finals 1984; 1st – Sundek Pro-Am Challenge 1984

Reginald "Reggie" Barnes Jr. (born c. 1961) is a retired American professional freestyle skateboarder and the founder/CEO of Eastern Skateboard Supply, the largest skateboard wholesale company in North America. Known as a "virtuoso" teen amateur, Barnes skated professionally from 1980 to 1991, with the Pepsi-Cola Pro Skateboard Team, Walker Skateboards, and Dogtown Skateboards. By 1986, Barnes was one of the top five American freestyle skaters in the United States and was a featured demonstrator at Expo 86, the world's fair held in Vancouver, Canada. He placed third in freestyle at the World Cup in 1987.

Barnes retired from competitive skateboarding when his interest switched to street skateboarding and running his two businesses. In 1986, he opened the retail skateboard shop, Endless Grind, in Raleigh, North Carolina. He used his skating connections to bring professional skaters to the East Coast where their demonstrations attracted the interest of the next generation of skaters. One event, the 1986 Endless Grind / Bones Brigade Skateboard Showdown, featured Barnes competing against Steve Caballero; their showdown was captured in East Coast Motions, a 2018 documentary.

Barnes' primary business, Eastern Skateboard Supply, is a wholesale company in Wilmington, North Carolina, with annual sales of $24.64 million in 2021. The company produces and distributes Tony Hawk's Birdhouse Skateboards and other brands such as Plan B Skateboards. Barnes hires former skaters and built a corporate skatepark at the company's warehouse, which features the East Coast's biggest skate bowl.

While he was a professional skater, three Reggie Barnes skateboards were issued, two with Walker and one with Dogtown. Although greatly overshadowed by his contemporary Rodney Mullen, generally considered the greatest freestyle skater of all time, Barnes was influential in the spread of skateboarding, especially along the East Coast of the United States.

== Early life ==
Barnes is from Cary, North Carolina, and attended Cary High School, graduating in 1979.

Barnes became interested in skateboarding after seeing an article in Sports Illustrated about Gregg Weaver who skated in empty swimming pools in California. In 1976, when he was fourteen years old, Barnes purchased his first skateboard, a Super Surfer with clay wheels, from a neighbor for $2. That was quickly replaced with a used skateboard with metal wheels—one that he says worked better on asphalt. He became a member of the Wizard Skate Team, an amateur team supported by the Wizard Skate Park in Raleigh, North Carolina, but moved on as he progressed.

Barnes' specialty became freestyle; this form of skating that paired music with handstands, wheelies, and kickflips suited Barnes, who enjoyed being a show-off. He spent "hours on end" alone with a boombox, practicing his routines; one of his favorite places to practice was the open-air basketball courts at nearby North Carolina State University in Raleigh, North Carolina.

== Amateur career ==
Two years after he began skating, Barnes had become one of North Carolina's top skaters, taking sixth place in freestyle in his first National Skateboard Association Contest, the U.S. Open Skateboard Competition in Jacksonville, Florida, in March 1978. Barnes "caught the attention of the seasoned professionals" when he skated at the Oceanside Amateur Freestyle Contest in June 1978, despite only coming in fifth place.

Barnes joined the team for Powerflex, a skateboard wheel company based in California, getting equipment and travel expenses in return for participating in demonstrations and competitions. Powerflex offered a salary, but Barnes turned it down, preferring to remain an amateur because he wanted to make the 1980 Summer Olympic exhibition team.

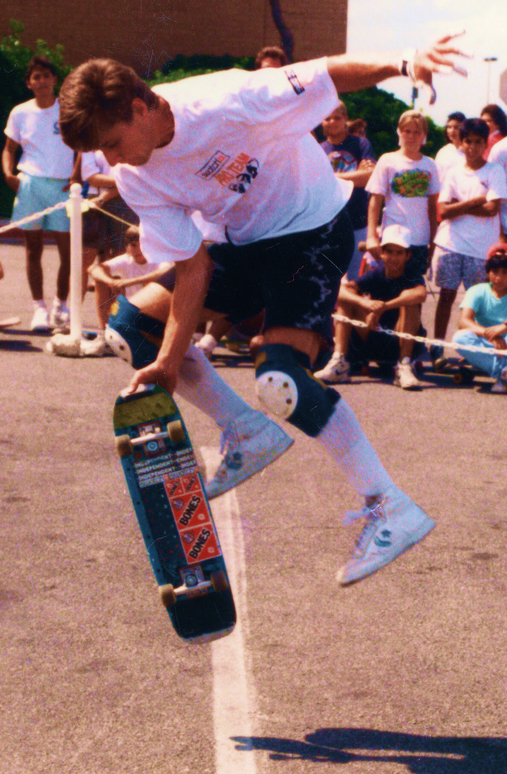
Rodney Mullen demonstrating freestyle

In September 1978, Barnes participated in the Pepsi/Nova Team Challenge as part of Team Powerflex. He had "a dynamic freestyle routine", earning 285 points and placing 1st in the age 16–19 freestyle contest. Rodney Mullen, generally considered the best freestyle skaters of all time, placed 1st in the 13–15 category with 263 points.

Once Barnes learned to ride on his hands, his reputation grew; he was considered a virtuoso on the East Coast by 1979. In the spring of 1979, Pepsi called his parents and asked if their son could tour the country, giving demonstrations as part of the Pepsi-Cola Pro Skateboard Team. Although the call from Pepsi was a surprise, it was the era of the cola wars and Pepsi executives thought skateboarding was a good fit to their Pepsi Generation ad campaign. A senior year in high school, Barnes decided to graduate first.

== Professional career ==
Barnes became a professional skater in June 1979. He skated with the Pepsi Pro Skateboard Team on their second tour, performing as many as five demonstrations a day and 100 demonstrations across the summer. Pepsi was among the first to pay skaters well. However, Barnes says he did not feel like a "real pro" because he had yet to win money in competition."

When the summer tour ended, Barnes took his Pepsi earnings and moved to Huntington Beach California, where he hoped to compete against other professional skaters and win prize money. However, Barnes had picked a challenging time to become a professional skater. Editor of the National Skateboard Review, Di Dootson, explains, "By early 1979, the insurance industry had effectively closed many skateparks across the country." This negatively impacted retail shops, competitions, and companies like Barnes' sponsor Powerflext, which had shut down.

Barnes had to wait six months for a freestyle contest. Without Powerflex's backing, he had to personally pay the $50 entry fee (equivalent to $195 in 2022 money) for his first professional competition, the Oasis Freestyle Contest in San Diego in 1980. He came in fifth place, earning $50. Other skaters at the event included standing world champion Chris Chadwick who placed third, and Rodney Mullen, who placed first in his first-professional event. Admittedly homesick, Barnes felt he had accomplished his goals and returned to North Carolina.

Barnes signed with sponsor Walker Skateboards in 1980. Bruce Walker was a noted East Coast professional skater, and his Florida-based company was the first of its kind to be owned and operated by a skater. Walker paid for Barnes to fly to California for competitions, allowing Barnes to live in Wilmington North Carolina, where he could focus on both skating and surfing in his home state.

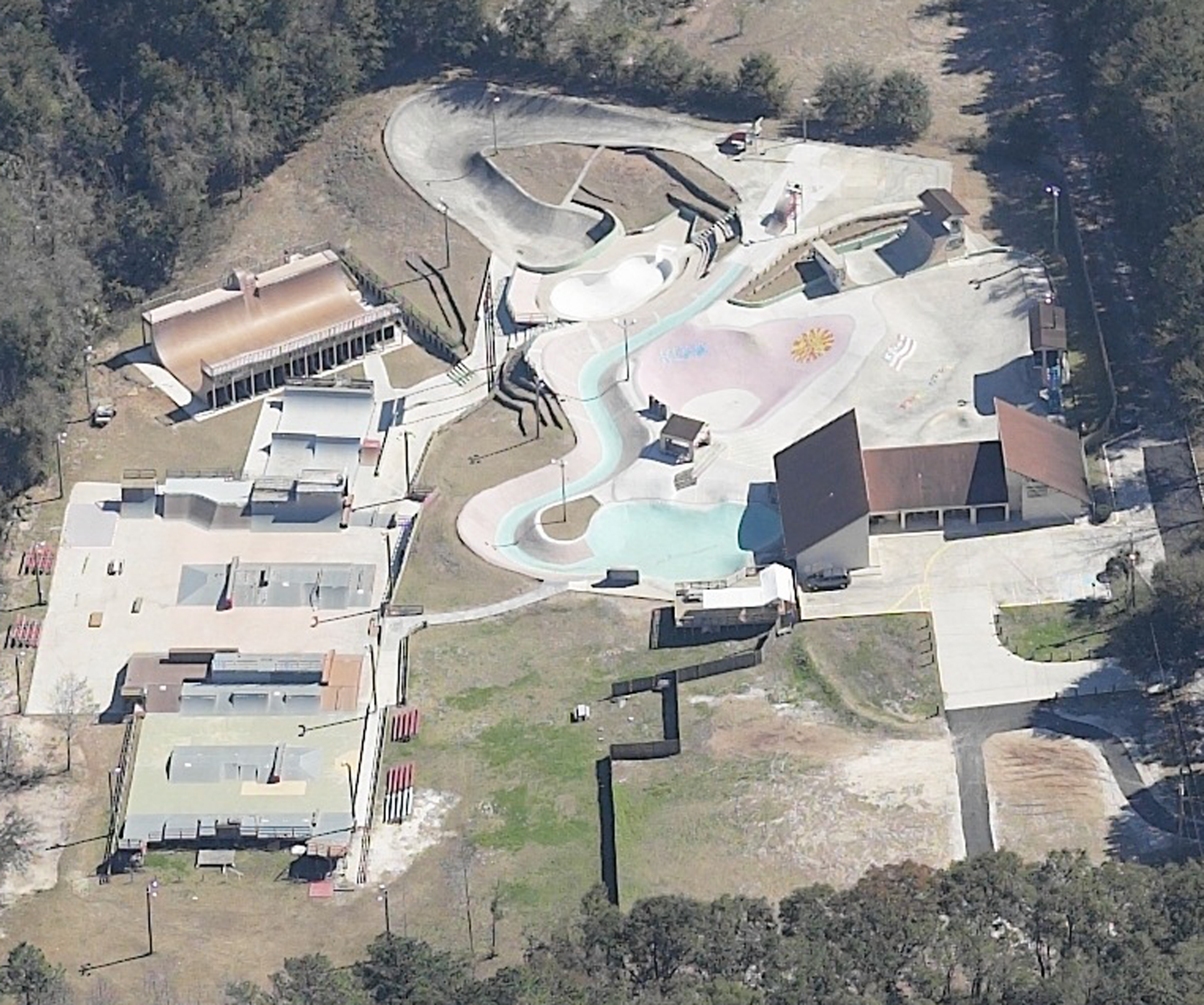
Kona Skatepark in Jacksonville, Florida

Logo for Expo 86, a world's fair held in Vancouver, Canada

Although he performed many demonstrations for Walker Skateboards, Barnes only competed three times during his first three years as a professional because of the limited number of contests. His second professional event was in 1981 at Magic Mountain, where the main attraction was the pro-freestyle event. Barnes came in third place. He told Thrasher magazine, "Good energy and crowds, back east they don't have much going on like this, so it's good fun for a change of sceneries [sic]. Lots of fun."

The third time he competed as a professional was at the 1984 Sundeck Pro-Am Skateboard Challenge in Kona Skatepark in Jacksonville, Florida. Barnes came in first place even though they played the wrong music for his first routine. Later that year, he placed second at the NSA Finals at the Del Mar Skate Ranch in California. However, according to Thrasher magazine, he almost ended up in the third place—a miscalculation of the scores by the judges was caught by Barnes' girlfriend and corrected.

In 1986, a group of skateboarding magazines selected Barnes as one of the top five American freestyle skaters. That same year, Barnes was a featured demonstrator at Expo 86, the world's fair held in Vancouver, Canada.

Barnes placed third in freestyle at the World Cup, Münster Monster Mastership, in Germany in 1987, despite the distractions of starting and running Eastern Skateboard Supply and Endless Grind retail store. In a 2010 online conversation, professional skating superstars Joachim "YoYo" Schulz and Stefan Akesson recalled this competition: Schulz, who came in seventh, wrote, "Check out the results page—a who is who in skateboarding. Some names are still around to this day! Even Reggie Barnes made it over. Stoked!" To which Akesson replied, "4th place for me... I really like the skating of Reggie, and he is a super nice person!"

In 1989, Barnes' rank had slipped to seventh best freestyle skater in the United States. Yet, at the NSA's Savanah Slamma in May 1989, Thrasher noted, "Reggie Barnes, for a man who hadn't skated since the Arizona finals [in December 1988], ripped." His freestyle rank declined after he became a businessman and because of his increased interest in street skateboarding, a modified version of freestyle that was better suited for urban settings. Barnes indicated that it was difficult to complete effectively in freestyle when he was actively demonstrating street style—the two styles required different skateboards. Barnes competed professionally until 1991.

After retiring from as a professional skater, Barnes continued to demonstrate and supported new skaters through Endless Grind and Eastern Skateboard Supply. On November 1, 2000, Barnes was one of three judges for the Freestyle World Championships Contest and Reunion, the first Pro/Am freestyle event in almost ten years, held at the Embarcadero in San Francisco, California. One outcome of this event, which also served as a reunion of former skaters, was the creation of the World Freestyle Skateboard Association.

=== Competitions ===
This incomplete list includes known NSA and international competitions in which Barnes competed.

| Date | Competition | Location | Place | Category | Source |
|---|---|---|---|---|---|
| March 24–26, 1978 | 1st U.S. Open Skateboard Championship | Kona Skate Park, Jacksonville, Florida | 6th | Amateur Freestyle | |
| June 10–11, 1978 | 1st Annual Southern Pepsi Team Challenge | Sensation Basin, Gainesville, Florida | 3rd | Amateur Freestyle Junior | |
| June 17–18, 1978 | Oceanside National Pro-Am Freestyle Contest | Oceanside, California | 5th | Amateur Freestyle Men 16+ Sponsored | |
| September 2–3, 1978 | Pepsi/Nova Team Challenge | United States | 1st | Amateur Freestyle Age 16–19 | |
| 1980 | Oasis Freestyle Contest | Oasis Skate Park, San Diego, California | 5th | Pro–Freestyle | |
| August 30, 1981 | Magic Mountain Freestyle Contest | Valencia, California | 3rd | Pro–Freestyle | |
| May 1984 | Sundek Pro–Am Skateboard Challenge | Kona Skate Park, Jacksonville, Florida | 1st | Pro–Freestyle | |
| August 5, 1984 | NSA Summer Series Contest Embarcadero Freestyle Contest | San Diego, California | 3rd | Pro–Freestyle | |
| 1984 | NSA (National Skateboard Association) Finals | Del Mar Skate Ranch, Del Mar, California | 2nd | Pro–Freestyle | |
| July 19–20, 1986 | Oceanside Freestyle Contest | Oceanside, California | 5th | Pro–Freestyle | |
| 1987 | International Freestyle Contest | Olympic Velodrome, Carson, California | 10th | Pro–Freestyle | |
| 1987 | Münster Monster Mastership (World Cup) | Münster, Germany | 3rd | Pro–Freestyle | |
| May 30–31, 1987 | Canadian International Championship | Toronto, Canada | 6th | Pro–Freestyle | |
| 1988 | Youth Skate Freestyle Contest | Embarcadero, San Francisco, California | 13th | Pro–Freestyle | |
| December 10–11, 1988 | NSA Freestyle Pro Finals | Phoenix, Arizona | 7th | Pro–Freestyle | |
| May 19, 1989 | Savannah Slamma 3 (NSA Pro Tour) | Savannah, Georgia | | Pro–Freestyle | |

=== Sponsors and skateboards ===
Barnes' first sponsor was Powerflex Wheels. Although their product was good, Powerflex was negatively impacted by the decline in skateboarding, closing by 1980 when Barnes became a professional skater. Later, Bones Wheels and Gotcha Sportswear became his sponsors. Converse was another sponsor, and Barnes usually skated in Carolina blue, high-top Chuck Taylor All-Stars.

Barnes endorsed a line of skateboards while he was signed to Walker Skateboards. The Reggie Barnes' Pro Freestyle Skateboard was first released in 1985. The 1987 model featured tailbones or heavy plastic bumpers under both ends and his signature graphic—an Egyptian god Anubis on a skateboard, surrounded by hieroglyphics, including a Tar Heel footprint to symbolize his North Carolina origins. The Reggie Barnes' Street Skate was instroduced in 1989 and featured a kicked 4-inch nose and a new graphic of a mummy breaking out of a neon-yellow coffin, with an Anubis graphic on the lid. The street model was 30.25 by 9.625 inches (768.3 by 244.5 mm), compared to the 27 by 7.25 inches (686 by 184 mm) freestyle model. Barnes earned $1 (equivalent to $3 in 2022 money) for each skateboard purchased in his Walker line.

Later, Barnes skated for Dogtown Skateboards which issued a Reggie Barnes model. The 1990 Reggie Barnes Skateboard graphic is of a cartoon-style trashcan with two hands lifting the lid from inside.

== Other ventures ==
=== Filmography ===
In the 1980s, Unreel Productions produced a series of videos documenting the National Skateboard Association's championship competitions. Released in 1986, Skateboard: NSA '86 Summer Series Volume 4: Oceanside Street Attack showed highlights of the Oceanside, California Freestyle Contest, including Barnes' entire fifth place routine. In 2006, Pantheon Home Video released License to Skate!, a five-part series of how-to videos that featured Barnes and other early professional skaters with Walker, including Chris Baucom, Chuck Dinkins, Joe Humeres, Jim McCall, Tim Morris, Bill Robinson, and Paul Schneider.

Barnes was a stunt double for several films produced in Wilmington, North Carolina, including David Lynch's Blue Velvet (1986), Stephen King's Maximum Overdrive (1986), and Teenage Mutant Ninja Turtles (1990), where he doubled for Donatello riding a skateboard.

Barnes is featured in East Coast Motions Volume 1, a 2018 documentary that features Steve Caballero and Barnes in the 1986 Endless Grind / Bones Brigade Skateboard Showdown in Raleigh, North Carolina, along with the 1985 Record Bar Pro-Am ASP Surf Tour at Wrightsville Beach, North Carolina.

=== Eastern Skateboard Supply ===
In 1985, Raleigh businessman Skip Flythe approached the 24-year-old Barnes about starting a skateboard distribution company. As the only professional skater in North Carolina, Barnes had the industry contacts, while Flythe had the necessary financial connections. Before entering a deal, Barnes contacted his mentor, Bruce Walker, who owned a small distribution business and skateboard company in Florida. According to Barnes, Walker said, "Thank you for asking me, but go ahead and do it. …If you don't do it, someone else will." Years later, when Walker retired, he sold his distribution company to Barnes.

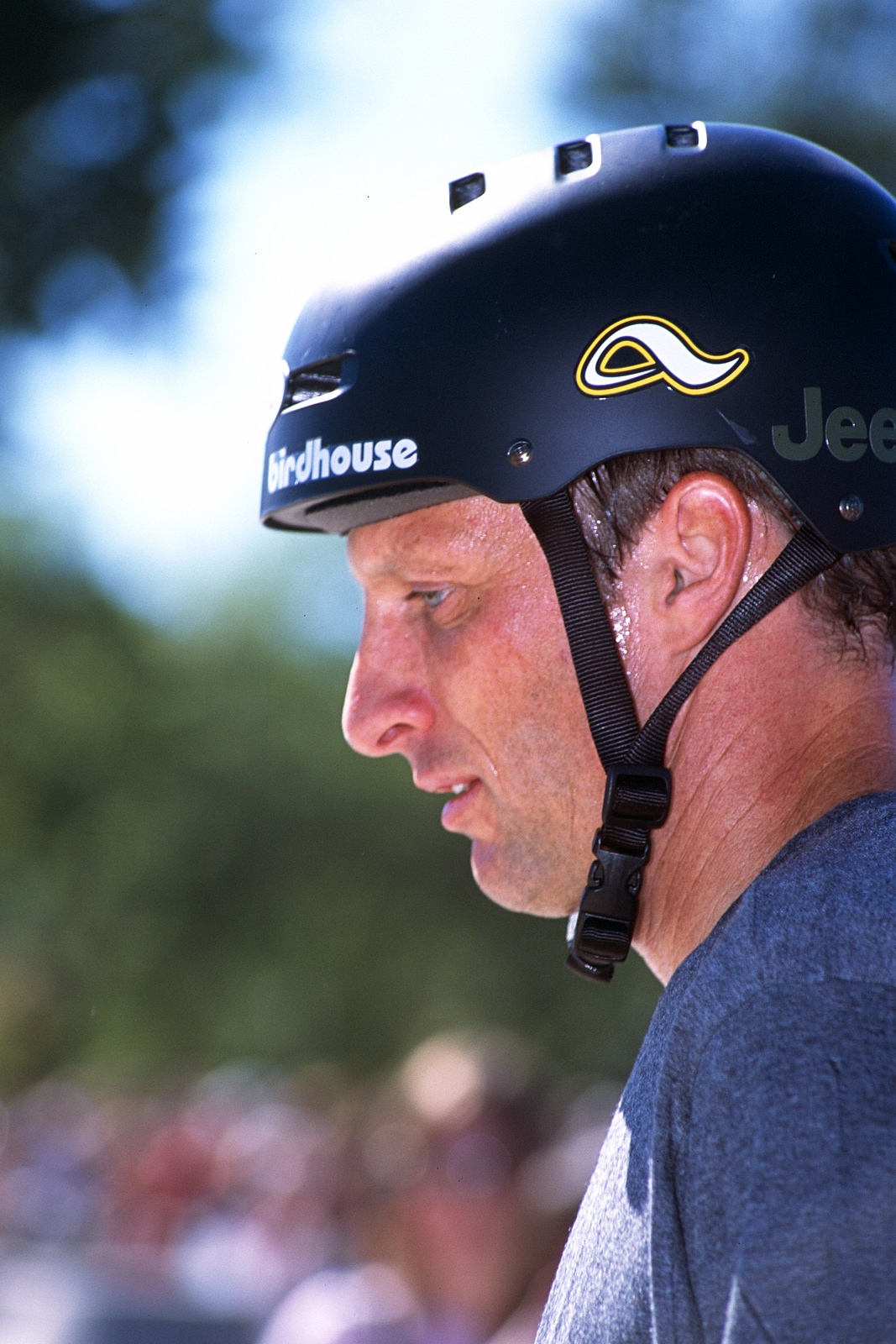
Tony Hawk

Eastern Skateboard Supply began in 1985, representing just one brand and gradually adding others. After eighteen months, Barnes made an offer to buy out Flythe, becoming the sole owner of Eastern in 1987. By 1990, the company had grossed around $5 million (equivalent to $12,321,701 in 2022 money). As of 2021, Eastern Skateboard Supply's annual sales were $24.64 million in the United States. It is largest skateboard wholesale company in North America. The company's headquarters are in Wilmington, North Carolina, with additional warehouses in Florida and Texas.

In 2008, Tony Hawk decided to produce a lower-priced skateboard to support his Birdhouse team, he contacted his "old friend Reggie Barnes" to license, manufacture, and distribute Birdhouse Skateboards to skate shops. This is the only brand that Eastern manufactures; Barnes took on Birdhouse Skateboards because of his appreciation for Hawk. Some other brands Eastern carries include Enjoi, Hook-Ups, Plan B Skateboards, and Zero. The company has also diversified and carries surfing supplies.

Eastern works with its brands to promote skating. In 2007, Barnes organized a ten-day European tour of Madrid, Hamburg, Rotterdam, and Amsterdam—reflecting Eastern's expansion into the European market. The tour featured demonstrations by professional skaters from his brands, including Jason Adams, Kyle Berard, Chet Childress, Pat Duffy from Plan B, as well as Adam Dyet, Mike Peterson, and Willy Santos. Duffy said:

Reggie Barnes is the biggest distributor on the East Coast and he’s been hooking us up and selling our boards for years, so we may as well go and give a little bit back. And it was such a good tour for ten days, and then in Wilmington, which is where the distribution is, I met up with the whole team, and with that crew plus the Plan B crew, we did a huge Reggie Barnes-Eastern Skate Supply demo. It was INSANITY.

Many of Eastern's 40 to 40 employees are experienced with skateboarding, including former professional skaters Brian Drake and Ray Underhill, a former member of the Bones Brigade with Tony Hawk. As a perk for employees, the Wilmington warehouse includes a 20,000 square feet (1,900 m^{2}) private skatepark. Started as a half-pipe in the warehouse, Eastern's corporate skatepark has one of the biggest skate bowls on the East Coast, designed and built in birch by Team Pain Skateparks in 2007. The bowl is a separate 4,000 square feet (370 m^{2}) skating rink that is 9 feet (2.7 m) deep. To celebrate the completion of the skatepark, Barnes hosted twenty of the country's top skaters for demonstrations and autograph signings for more than 1,000 members of the public. Eastern's skatepark is a space where professional skaters can practice and film.

=== Endless Grind ===
In 1986, Barnes and businessmen Homer Croom and Skip Flythe opened Endless Grind, a retail skateboard shop in downtown Raleigh, North Carolina. Barnes bought out his partners in 1987, with a loan from his father. The shop's name refers to the sound the metal axle makes as skaters swing around the upper edge of an empty swimming pool. Because of his connections within the profession, Barnes frequently brings celebrity skaters to his store for demonstrations. He also sponsors an amateur Endless Grind team and organizes local competitions.

Skater Scott Bourne said, "I was really fortunate in that where I grew up; we had Reggie Barnes’ shop... Because he had such influence, he brought like World Industries and lots of teams; whoever was big came through NC on tour to Endless Grind skate shop. A lot of guys came out of there—Chet Childress, Kenny Hughes, Neal Hendrix. And you had a whole younger generation too, like Lennie Kirk. But Reggie really brought the industry to the middle part of the Eastern U.S." Barnes also brought Bones Brigade member Steve Caballero to Endless Grind, turning it into an opportunity for a Bones Brigade / Endless Grind Skateboard Showdown.

== Image and legacy ==
Although greatly overshadowed by his contemporary Rodney Mullen, generally considered the greatest freestyle skater of all time, Barnes was influential in the spread of skateboarding, especially along the East Coast of the United States. Skater Tommy Harward's first exposure to freestyle skating was at Barnes's school demonstration in 1987. Barnes not only encouraged young Harward to keep skating but also gave Harward one of his skateboards. Later, the Tommy Haward Pro Model skateboard by Outlook was based on the Reggie Barnes' freestyle model by Walker.

In the 1980s, amateur skater Bill Robertson, known today as Dr. Skateboard, decided to go to college because of the skateboarding industry's decline. After college, Robertson contacted Barnes who helped "resurrect" the former's skateboarding career; soon Robertson was a professional skater signed with Barnes' sponsor, Walker Skateboards. Robertson eventually won three Masters Freestyle championships and was inducted into the Freestyle Skateboarding Hall of Fame in 2010.

In 1985, Chuck Dinkins lived in Memphis, Tennessee and worked for a skateboard shop. In conjunction with a festival at the local fairgrounds, his employer arranged for professional skaters, Barnes and Jim McCall, to demonstrate freestyle. Dinkins says:

Jim and Reggie arrived and killed it. I had never really seen freestyle too much in person and was super stoked to have those guys come up. Both of them were super cool and professional. They even invited me to join in and I got to skate and showcase my flat land street style, plus launch ramp skills...I was skating with pros and had to step up my game...Reggie was smooth and stylish with Ollies, throwing in sweet G-Turns, etc...I didn’t know how impressed they were with me until a few weeks later when I got a call at the shop from Bruce Walker offering me a full sponsorship simply based on the word of Jim and Reggie.

Former professional skater, Kevin Shelton, tells a similar story. Shelton was from Mars Hill, North Carolina, and went to California in an unsuccessful attempt to turn his skating hobby into a career. When he returned to North Carolina, Shelton ran into Barnes who hired him to travel through the East Coast, demonstrating street style for Endless Grind. In 1986, Barnes gave Shelton his "big break," a chance to skate before Bruce Walker. Two years later, Shelton was a professional skater with full sponsorship with Walker Skateboards. Skate team manager, Mike Sinclair, who is known for ESPN's Real Street, started his career in skateboarding as a skater for the Endless Grind Team, eventually managing the team for Barnes and working in the Endless Grind store.

The founder and curator of the Morro Bay Skateboard Museum, Jack Smith, recalled, "I declared myself 'professional' so I could enter the freestyle event at the Trans-World Skateboarding Championship—one of the largest international tournaments in sport's history, held in conjunction with the World Exp in Vancouver, Canada...Reggie Barnes...was amongst the first to introduce himself and encourage me during the Vancouver freestyle event."

In 2006, Swedish professional skater Stefan Åkesson recalled attending the Münster Monster Mastership (World Cup) in 1987. He wrote, "We (me, Shane Rouse and Reggie Barnes) stayed in Christian Seewaldt's apartment...Reggie was working on his board, putting on sho-goo [sic] on the tail and gave me some secret tips on how to do it, something Shane always refused to help me with." In the competition, Rouse came in 2nd, Barnes 3rd, Akesson 4th, and Seewaldt 5th.

== Personal life ==
In the early 1980s, Barnes returned to North Carolina and attended the Cape Fear Technical Institute, where he received an associate degree in business administration. He stayed in Wilmington after graduating and supported his surfing lifestyle with a carpentry and construction business. Soon after, he opened Eastern Skateboard Supply and Endless Grind, both of which continue to be successful businesses.

In 2015, Barnes decided to introduce Hawaii's outrigger canoe culture to Wilmington, North Carolina. He purchased two outrigger canoes and placed them at Wrightsville SUP, a rental facility so that he could take his family and friends canoeing. Barnes' efforts were successful—in 2018, the Wrightsville Beach Outriggers Canoe Club had ninety members.

Barnes currently lives in Wrightsville Beach, North Carolina, which is adjacent to Wilmington. He has two children: daughter Lindsey and son Mason, who is a professional surfer. Barnes tries to surf every day, runs marathons, and competes in the downhill skateboard slalom. He is 5 feet, 6 inches tall.
