= List of Filipino American sportspeople =

This is a list of American sportspeople of Filipino descent.

== Baseball ==
- Benny Agbayani – former outfielder for the New York Mets, Colorado Rockies, and Boston Red Sox of Major League Baseball (MLB), and the Chiba Lotte Marines of Nippon Professional Baseball (NPB)
- Chris Aguila – former outfielder for the Florida Marlins and New York Mets of Major League Baseball (MLB), and the Fukuoka SoftBank Hawks of Nippon Professional Baseball (NPB)
- John André – former MLB pitcher for the Chicago Cubs
- Bobby Balcena – former MLB left fielder for the Cincinnati Redlegs
- Jason Bartlett – former MLB shortstop for the Minnesota Twins, Tampa Bay Rays, and San Diego Padres
- Bobby Chouinard – former MLB pitcher for the Oakland Athletics, Milwaukee Brewers, Arizona Diamondbacks, and Colorado Rockies
- Chase d'Arnaud – former MLB infielder for the Pittsburgh Pirates, Philadelphia Phillies, Atlanta Braves, Boston Red Sox, San Diego Padres, and San Francisco Giants
- Travis d'Arnaud – MLB catcher for the Los Angeles Angels
- Geno Espineli – former MLB relief pitcher for the San Francisco Giants
- Tim Lincecum – former MLB pitcher for the San Francisco Giants and Los Angeles Angels
- Kyle Lohse – former MLB pitcher for the Minnesota Twins, Cincinnati Reds, Philadelphia Phillies, St. Louis Cardinals, Milwaukee Brewers, and Texas Rangers
- Clay Rapada – former MLB relief pitcher for the Chicago Cubs, Detroit Tigers, Texas Rangers, Baltimore Orioles, New York Yankees, and Cleveland Indians
- Addison Russell – former infielder for the Chicago Cubs of Major League Baseball (MLB) and the Kiwoom Heroes of the KBO League
- Tyler Saladino – former infielder for the Chicago White Sox and Milwaukee Brewers of Major League Baseball (MLB) and the Samsung Lions of the KBO League
- John Sipin – former second baseman for the San Diego Padres of Major League Baseball (MLB) and the Taiyo Whales and Yomiuri Giants of Nippon Professional Baseball (NPB)
- Robert Stephenson – MLB pitcher for the Los Angeles Angels
- Brandon Villafuerte – former MLB pitcher for the Detroit Tigers, Texas Rangers, San Diego Padres, and Arizona Diamondbacks
- Anthony Volpe – MLB shortstop for the New York Yankees
- Kolten Wong – former MLB second baseman for the St. Louis Cardinals, Milwaukee Brewers, Seattle Mariners, and Los Angeles Dodgers
- Jordan Yamamoto – former MLB pitcher for the Miami Marlins and New York Mets

== Basketball ==
- Jimmy Alapag – former Talk 'N Text Tropang Texters and Gilas Pilipinas guard. Head coach of NLEX Road Warriors of the Philippine Basketball Association.
- Chris Banchero – guard for the Alaska Aces, Magnolia Hotshots & Meralco Bolts of the Philippine Basketball Association.
- Nic Belasco – 8–time PBA Champion.
- Jason Brickman – guard who played for the Mono Vampire of the ASEAN Basketball League and for Kaohsiung Aquas of the Taiwanese T1 League. Played college basketball for LIU Brooklyn.
- Noy Castillo – 3–time PBA All-Star.
- Jeffrey Cariaso – retired professional basketball player and former Alaska Aces shooting guard.
- Jordan Clarkson – guard for the New York Knicks. Represented the Philippines in international competition as part of Gilas Pilipinas.
- Mike Cortez – retired guard for the Blackwater Elite, Meralco Bolts, NorthPort Batang Pier & Air21 Express of the Philippine Basketball Association.
- Aaron Craft – guard for the Aquila Basket Trento of the Lega Basket Serie A. Played college basketball for the Ohio State Buckeyes and also played for the Santa Cruz Warriors of the NBA G League.
- Joe Devance – Retired PBA player; last played for the Barangay Ginebra San Miguel of the Philippine Basketball Association.
- Michael DiGregorio – guard who last played for the Blackwater Bossing of the Philippine Basketball Association.
- Jared Dillinger – guard/forward for the Barangay Ginebra San Miguel of the Philippine Basketball Association.
- Chris Ellis - 3-time PBA All-Star and PBA Slam Dunk Champion (2013).
- Simon Enciso – guard for the San Miguel Beermen of the Philippine Basketball Association. Played Division II basketball for Notre Dame de Namur.
- Matt Ganuelas-Rosser – forward for the TNT Tropang Giga small forward of the Philippine Basketball Association. Played Division II basketball for Cal Poly Pomona.
- Jalen Green – guard for the Phoenix Suns. FIBA Under-17 Basketball World Cup MVP representing the United States in 2018.
- Davonn Harp – 2-time PBA Commissioner's Cup Champion.
- Brian Heruela – guard for the TNT Tropang Giga of the Philippine Basketball Association.
- Dylan Harper – guard for the San Antonio Spurs.
- Ron Harper Jr. - small forward for the Boston Celtics.
- Michael Holper – retired PBA player.
- Isaac Holstein – 3-time PBA Champion.
- Marcio Lassiter – guard for the San Miguel Beermen of the Philippine Basketball Association. Played college basketball for Cal State Fullerton.
- Chris Lutz – 3-time PBA Champion. PBA All-Star.
- Jared McCain – guard for the Oklahoma City Thunder.
- Rashawn McCarthy – guard who last played for the Bacolod City of Smiles of the Maharlika Pilipinas Basketball League.
- Eric Menk – PBA MVP. Also a two-time member of the Philippine national basketball team.
- Sol Mercado – retired PBA player who played for the Rain or Shine Elasto Painters and Barangay Ginebra San Miguel of the Philippine Basketball Association.
- Kelly Nabong – forward/center for the Davao Occidental Tigers of the Maharlika Pilipinas Basketball League.
- Chris Newsome – guard for the Meralco Bolts of the Philippine Basketball Association.
- Gabe Norwood – guard/forward for the Rain or Shine Elasto Painters of the Philippine Basketball Association. Played college basketball for the George Mason Patriots and also represented the Philippines in FIBA sanctioned and international competition as part of Gilas Pilipinas.
- Jason Perkins – forward for the Phoenix Pulse Fuel Masters of the Philippine Basketball Association.
- Hernando Planells – basketball coach.
- Stanley Pringle – guard for Rain or Shine Elasto Painters of the Philippine Basketball Association. Represented the Philippines in international competition as part of Gilas Pilipinas.
- Chris Ross – guard for the San Miguel Beermen of the Philippine Basketball Association.
- Andy Seigle – a two-time member of the Philippine national basketball team.
- Danny Seigle – 8–time PBA Champion. A two-time member of the Philippine national basketball team.
- Greg Slaughter – center who last played for the Manila SV Batang Sampaloc SGA of the Maharlika Pilipinas Basketball League.
- Erik Spoelstra – head coach of the Miami Heat.
- Raymond Townsend – UCLA Bruins and Golden State Warriors guard
- Moala Tautuaa – American born with Filipino and Tongan descent. Center/forward for the San Miguel Beermen of the Philippine Basketball Association.
- Josh Urbiztondo – PBA Champion and PBA All–Star.
- Jay Washington – forward for the Rain or Shine Elasto Painters of the Philippine Basketball Association and for Ryukyu Golden Kings & Yokohama Excellence of Japan B.League. Played Division II basketball for Eckerd College.
- Kelly Williams – forward/center for the TNT Tropang Giga of the Philippine Basketball Association.

== Chess ==
- Wesley So - chess grandmaster, born Filipino with Chinese descent.

== Combat Sports/Martial Arts ==
- Eddie Abasolo – martial artist
- Romie Adanza – kickboxer
- Chris Cariaso – mixed martial artist, fought in the UFC
- Arianny Celeste – UFC octagon girl and model
- Shane Del Rosario – mixed martial artist, fought in the UFC
- John Dodson – Mixed martial artist, fought in the UFC. Ultimate Fighter 14 winner.
- Glenn Donaire – Nonito Donaire's older brother, also a boxer in the flyweight and junior flyweight classes.
- Nonito Donaire – Four-Division Boxing World Champion (112 lbs, 118 lbs, 122 lbs and 126 lbs.)
- Adriano Directo Emperado – one of five martial artists who developed the Kajukenbo self-defense system
- Andrew Ganigan – former boxing lightweight contender.
- Dan Inosanto – Head of Bruce Lee's JKD, Head of Lacoste / Inosanto FMA.
- Tito Jones – mixed martial artist
- Ana Julaton – Boxer
- Robbie Lawler – mixed martial artist, UFC Welterweight Champion. Lawler is a quarter Filipino through his mother's side.
- Troy Mandaloniz – mixed martial artist, fought in the UFC
- Paige McPherson – 2012 Summer Olympics Taekwondo bronze medalist
- Yancy Medeiros – mixed martial artist, fought in the UFC
- Mark Muñoz – mixed martial artist, fought in the UFC
- Phillipe Nover – mixed martial artist, fought in the UFC
- Elena Reid - professional boxer and mixed martial artist
- Ernie Reyes Jr. – martial artist
- Ernie Reyes Sr. – martial artist
- Jesus Salud - 1989 WBA super bantamweight champion
- Ricky Turcios - mixed martial artist, fought in the UFC
- Brandon Vera – mixed martial artist, fought in the UFC
- Brian Viloria – US Olympic boxer, former WBC light-flyweight champion
- Dado Marino Former WBA Flyweight Champion

== Cycling, Road, BMX, and Track ==
- Daniel Caluag – 2012 Summer Olympics BMX Cyclist from Philippines Team
- Coryn Labecki – professional USA women's racing cyclist (Team Sunweb)

== Fencing ==
- Lee Kiefer – U.S. Olympic Fencing Team
- Mitchell Saron – U.S. Olympic Fencing Team

== Football ==
- Tyler Allgeier – NFL running back for the Atlanta Falcons
- Eugene Amano – former NFL offensive lineman for the Tennessee Titans
- Doug Baldwin – former NFL wide receiver for the Seattle Seahawks
- Zaire Barnes – NFL linebacker for the New York Giants
- Tedy Bruschi – former NFL linebacker for the New England Patriots
- Camryn Bynum – NFL safety for the Indianapolis Colts
- Matt Castelo – former college football linebacker for the San Jose State Spartans
- Tariq Castro-Fields – NFL cornerback for the Philadelphia Eagles
- Chris Collier – NFL running back for the Las Vegas Raiders
- Jordon Dizon – former NFL linebacker for the Detroit Lions
- Kamren Fabiculanan – college football safety for the Washington Huskies
- Aaron Francisco – former NFL safety
- Dillon Gabriel – NFL quarterback for the Cleveland Browns
- Roman Gabriel – former NFL quarterback for the Los Angeles Rams and Philadelphia Eagles
- Chris Gocong – former NFL linebacker for the Philadelphia Eagles and Cleveland Browns
- Andrei Iosivas – NFL wide receiver for the Cincinnati Bengals
- Keith Ismael – NFL center
- Josh Jacobs – NFL running back for the Green Bay Packers
- Jason Myers – NFL placekicker for the Seattle Seahawks
- Jordan Norwood – former NFL wide receiver and punt returner for the Cleveland Browns, Philadelphia Eagles, Tampa Bay Buccaneers, and Denver Broncos
- Nikko Remigio – NFL wide receiver and return specialist for the Kansas City Chiefs
- Sean Rhyan – NFL guard for the Green Bay Packers
- Ronnie Rivers – NFL running back for the Los Angeles Rams
- Chris Rix – former college football quarterback for the Florida State Seminoles
- Steve Slaton – former NFL running back for the Houston Texans and Miami Dolphins
- Curtis Weaver – former NFL linebacker for the Cleveland Browns
- Johnny Wilson – NFL wide receiver for the Philadelphia Eagles
- Anthony Witherstone – NFL cornerback for the Kansas City Chiefs

== Figure Skating ==
- Tai Babilonia – Olympic figure skater (African American mother; Filipino and Hopi-Indian father)
- Christopher Caluza– 2013 Lombardia Trophy silver medalist
- Amanda Evora – U.S. Olympic figure skater (pairs/ice dancing)
- Kristine Musademba – U.S. figure skater (Filipino mother)
- Elizabeth Punsalan – U.S. Olympic figure skater (pairs/ice dancing) (Filipino father)

== Hockey ==
- Jason Robertson – NHL left winger for the Dallas Stars
- Nicholas Robertson – NHL left winger for the Toronto Maple Leafs
- Tim Stapleton – former NHL center for the Toronto Maple Leafs, Atlanta Thrashers, and Winnipeg Jets

== Golf ==
- Ricky Castillo – professional golfer, PGA Tour
- Allisen Corpuz – professional golfer, LPGA
- Dorothy Delasin – professional golfer, LPGA
- Rico Hoey – professional golfer, PGA Tour
- Jennifer Rosales – professional golfer, LPGA
- Isaiah Salinda – professional golfer, PGA Tour
- J. J. Spaun – professional golfer, PGA Tour

== Gymnastics ==
- Aleah Finnegan – represented the Philippines at the 2024 Olympic Games; former USA national team member.
- Emma Malabuyo – alternate for the 2020 Olympic team (USA); currently representing the Philippines in international competition.
- Kyla Ross – member of the Fierce Five, the gold medal-winning US Women's Gymnastics team at the 2012 Summer Olympics.
- Levi Ruivivar – represented the Philippines at the 2024 Olympic Games.
- Ava Verdeflor – Philippines national team member training in Allen, Texas. 2014 Youth Olympics competitor.

== Poker ==
- Noli Francisco
- Toto Leonidas

== Skateboarding ==
- Henry Gutierrez – professional vert skateboarder
- Sean Malto – professional skateboarder
- Pat Ngoho – professional vert skateboarder/artist
- Lizzie Armanto – professional vert skateboarder
- Adrian Demain – professional vert skateboarder/artist
- Willy Santos – professional skateboarder
- Sergie Ventura – professional vert skateboarder
- Doug Saladino – professional vert skateboarder

== Soccer ==
- Joshua Alcala – American born Hispanic/Filipino soccer player. Has played in the United States Soccer Leagues D1 & D2.
- Henry Brauner – has played in the USL Premier Development League and the Philippines national team.
- Anton del Rosario – American born. Played NCAA soccer for Skyline College, Notre Dame de Namur University, and Philippine national football team.
- Natasha Kai – American soccer player and member of the United States women's national soccer team.
- Nick Rimando – Filipino, Mexican American soccer player who currently plays for Real Salt Lake in Major League Soccer.
- Tiffany Roberts – American soccer player and former member of the United States Women's National Soccer Team (Filipina mother).
- 18 of the 23 members of the Philippines national team that reached the 2023 FIFA Women's World Cup:
  - Tahnai Annis – midfielder and team captain
  - Alicia Barker – defender
  - Sarina Bolden – forward
  - Reina Bonta – defender
  - Ryley Bugay – midfielder and defender
  - Malea Cesar – defender
  - Jessika Cowart – defender and midfielder
  - Kiara Fontanilla – goalkeeper
  - Isabella Flanigan – forward
  - Carleigh Frilles – midfielder
  - Katrina Guillou – forward
  - Sofia Harrison – defender
  - Kaiya Jota – goalkeeper
  - Hali Long – defender
  - Chandler McDaniel – forward and midfielder
  - Olivia McDaniel – goalkeeper
  - Quinley Quezada – midfielder
  - Dominique Randle – defender
- Two of the three alternates on the 2023 FIFA Women's World Cup squad:
  - Maya Alcantara – defender and midfielder
  - Isabella Pasion – midfielder
- Other Philippines women's national team members:
  - Heather Cooke
  - Eva Madarang
  - Jessica Miclat

== Speed Skating ==
- J.R. Celski – 2014 Winter Olympics silver medalist & 2010 Winter Olympics bronze medalist for short track speed skating. and five-time world champion medalist.

== Track & Field ==
- Rene Herrera
- Eric Cray
- Trenten Beram
- Kristina Knott

== Table Tennis ==
- Angelita Rosal – Four times U.S. National Table Tennis champion.

== Tennis ==
- Cecil Mamiit
- Treat Conrad Huey
- Lilia Osterloh
- Eric Taino
- Riza Zalameda

== Volleyball ==
- Liz Masakayan – Professional beach volleyball player.
- David McKienzie – member of US national team.
- Iris Tolenada – played in the Philippine Superliga & Premier Volleyball League.
- Kalei Mau – played for COCOLIFE Asset Managers & F2 Logistics Cargo Movers in the Philippine Superliga & Premier Volleyball League.

== Water Sports ==
- Victoria Manalo Draves – diver who was the first Asian American gold medalist, and first woman to win two gold medals in springboard diving at the 1948 Olympics in London.
- Sunny Garcia – surfing world champion, surfing legend.
- Malia Jones – surfing model, People Magazine's 50 Most Beautiful People.
- Natalie Coughlin – International swimmer and twelve-time Olympic medalist (with Filipino ancestry)
- Nicole Oliva - Swimmer
- Henley Masa – surfing world champion, WSL U.S. Open Champion
- Bella Sims – Swimmer, 2020 Tokyo Olympic silver medalist (with Filipino ancestry)

== Wrestling ==
- David Bautista – former professional mixed martial artist, and former professional wrestler best known for his time in the WWE under the ring name Batista. He is a six-time world champion, winning the World Heavyweight Championship four times and the WWE Championship twice.
- Michael Paris – better known as DJZ for his time with TNA Wrestling. Currently signed with WWE where he performs on both WWE and Lucha Libre AAA Worldwide under the ring name Joaquin Wilde.
- Benny Cuntapay – also known by his ring alias B-Boy. Performer in CZW or Combat Zone Wrestling, also wrestled as Bael in Lucha Underground but was killed off in a storyline angle.
- T. J. Perkins – best known as the Inaugural WWE Cruiserweight Champion. Also a former wrestler for TNA Wrestling formerly known as Suicide. Perkins is also known by his ring aliases Pinoy Boy and Puma.
- Kris Hernandez – better known by the ring name Kris Wolf
- Ashley Louise Urbanski – currently signed with MLW where she performs under the ring name, Shotzi Blackheart.
- Allyssa Lyn "Lacey" Lane – currently signed to AEW and Ring of Honor where she performs under the ring name Lacey Lane.
- Jeff Cobb – better known for his time with NJPW, Ring of Honor, WWE and All Elite Wrestling. Cobb was formerly Never Openweight Champion, ROH tag team Champion, PWG World Champion, and Filipino Pro Wrestling Champion.
