= Kona Skatepark =

Skateboard park in Jacksonville, Florida

- Location within Florida
- Location: 8739 Kona Ave, Jacksonville, Florida, U.S.
- Coordinates: 30.3230°N 81.5650°W
- Area: 9 acres (0.036 km^{2})
- Established: June 4, 1977
- Designer: Martin Ramos II
- Operator: Martin Ramos III
- Open: daily, Noon - 9pm, closed Mondays
- Status: Open all year
- Website: Kona Skatepark

Kona Skatepark is a skateboard park in the Arlington area of Jacksonville, Florida, United States. It was built during the 1970s skateboarding boom, when many other cities opened their first skateparks. Kona is the oldest surviving commercial skatepark in the world.

== Origins ==
The park was opened by Martin and Helen Ramos with a number of investors June 4, 1977. The original attractions were a pro bowl with a six-foot vertical "tombstone", a freestyle area, plus snake and J-runs with cruising features including banked curves and speed runs. Kona was host to the U.S. Open of Skateboarding in 1977 & 1978, the first-time west coast boarders traveled to compete against their competitors on the east coast. The contests attracted the top skateboarding professionals at the time. Crowds packed the stands to see amazing tricks in person and learn new moves.

In the mid-1970s, Skateboarder magazine pictured 30’ tall concrete pipes found in the California desert. Kona attempted to create one, but the project bankrupted Kona and the park closed from late 1978 to the Summer of 1979. In the end, it was declared unrideable. However, during that time trespassers on skateboards, motorcycles, BMX bikes and cars used the facilities in "epic sessions". The Ramos family acquired the property from the other investors and it reopened June 27, 1979 dedicated to Jacksonville's youth as a fun and safe location for kids and families.

== 1980s ==
Kona built one of the first half-pipe ramps with a flat bottom in 1980, and a pool was added to the park's features.

In 1981, Ramos partnered with Gil Losi of Variflex and produced the first Professional vertical ramp event, The Kona/Variflex Summer Nationals. That same year, Skateboarder magazine became Action Now. Kona published more than 12 issues of Skateboard, a glossy-cover magazine that was a forerunner of several homemade skate magazines. The Kona/Variflex Summer Nationals were also held in Jacksonville during 1982 and 1983.

About 1983, a mini-spine ramp was constructed.

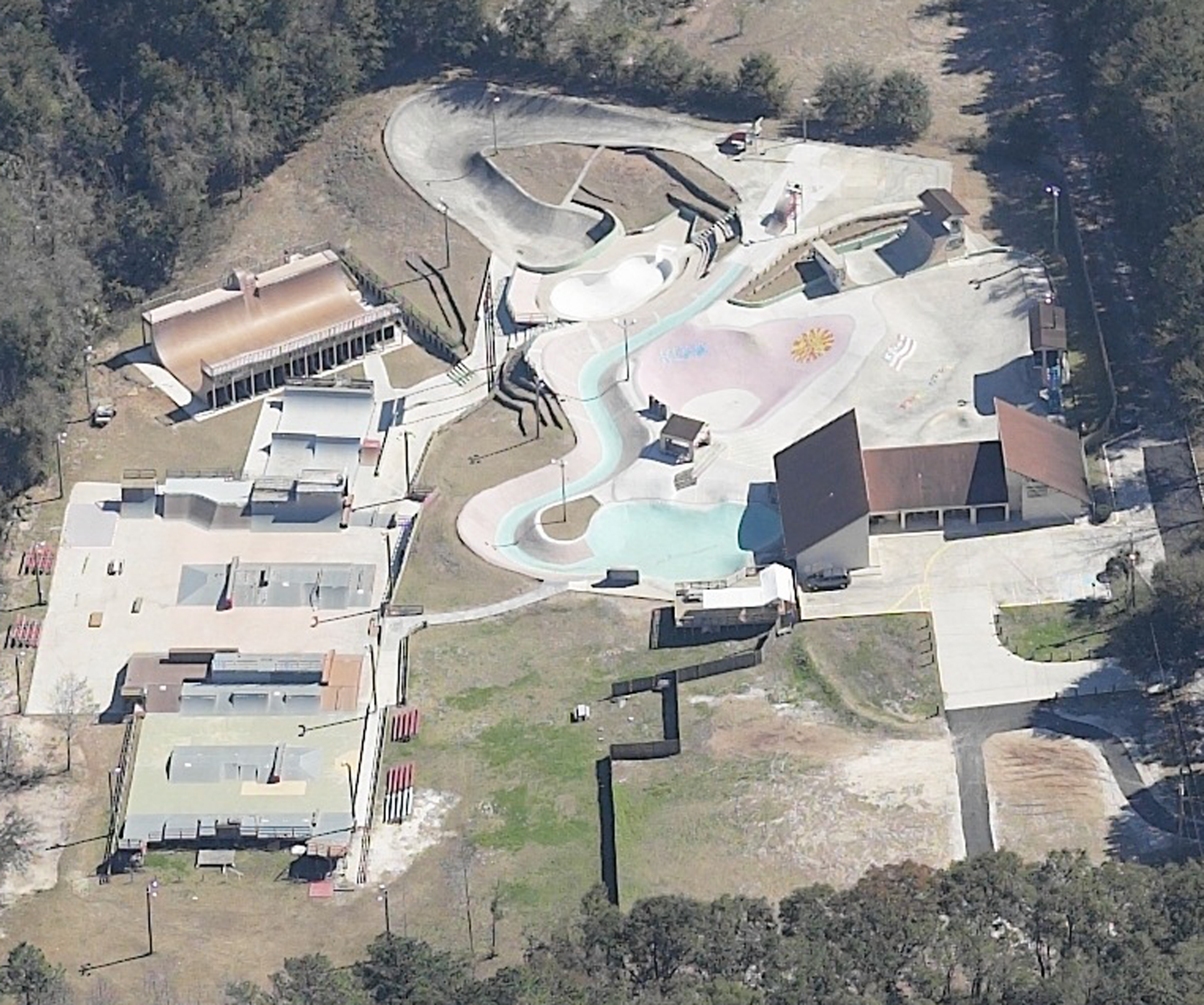
Kona Skatepark aerial, 2005

== 1990s ==
At the World Cup event in 1991 held at Kona, Danny Way jumped the huge distance between the bowl and the snake run, which "blew minds". Way was named 1991 "Skater of the Year" by Thrasher magazine That jump was his inspiration when he designed a Mega Ramp ten years later.

Prior to Martin Ramos' death in 1995, most maintenance at the park had been deferred. His son, Martin III took control of the park. He learned how to operate and maintain the skatepark, and with his family's assistance, the park flourished.

A mini-ramp with a bowl and a street course was added in 1999.

== 2000s ==
The first Vertical Ramp built in the 1980s was replaced in 2001.

In 2002, the Kona Skatepark was a location in Tony Hawk's Pro Skater 4 video game.

In 2003, Danny Way performed a 360° rotation over the huge gap between the bowl and the snake run that he jumped in 1991.

== 2010s ==
The skatepark was threatened with closure in 2015 after a video went viral that showed a father pushing his reluctant young child off the edge of the vertical ramp.

== 40th anniversary ==
The skatepark celebrated their 40th anniversary in 2017 and several well-renowned skateboarders returned to perform. Professional skateboarders Clyde Singleton and Mike Peterson learned to skateboard at Kona. Other skateboarding stars skating at Kona include Tony Hawk, Steve Berra and Birdhouse Skateboards, Tony Alva, Rodney Mullen, Buck Smith Steve Caballero, Jeff Phillips, Christian Hosoi, Neil Blender and John Lucero.

== Oldest skatepark ==
Derby Skatepark in Santa Cruz, California opened the year prior to Kona in 1976. The Yelp website reports that the location has closed and the City of Jacksonville now claims Kona as the oldest surviving skatepark. When Del Mar Skate Ranch closed in 1987 and Upland Skatepark was shuttered in 1989, Kona was the only active skatepark in the U.S. In 2019, the Guinness Book of World Records named Kona the "Oldest Surviving commercial Skatepark".

In 2024 the vertical ramp was over 20 years old, riddled with holes and unsafe to ride. $60,000 was needed to rebuild it.

== Local skateparks ==
Jacksonville is home to several public skating parks, including Monument Park in Arlington; Artist Walk Skatepark in Riverside; Veterans Skatepark in St. Johns; Orange Park Skatepark; South Beach Skatepark in Jacksonville Beach; Treaty Skatepark in St. Augustine; the Skate Yard and Oceanside Park in Atlantic Beach.
