= Reggie Barnes =

Reggie Barnes may refer to:

- Reggie Barnes (running back) (born 1967), American football player
- Reggie Barnes (linebacker) (born 1969), American football player
- Reggie Barnes (skateboarder) (born c. 1961), American skateboarder

== See also ==
- Sir Reginald Barnes, cavalry officer in the British Army
