= CFCC =

CFCC may refer to:

- Cape Fear Community College, in Wilmington, North Carolina, United States
- College of Central Florida (formerly Central Florida Community College), in Ocala, Florida, United States
