= Cafe FX =

US feature film visual effects company

CafeFX ComputerCafe
- Type: Private
- Industry: Visual effects, CGI animation
- Founded: 1993
- Defunct: 2010
- Headquarters: Santa Maria, California, USA
- Number of employees: 14 or more

CafeFX was an American feature film visual effects facility offering visual effects production and supervision, CGI character creation, and 3D animation. Founded in 1993 by Jeff Barnes and David Ebner, CafeFX was located in a 36,000-square-foot (3,300 m^{2}) studio on an eight-acre campus in Santa Maria in Santa Barbara County. Its commercial and music video division, Santa Monica-based The Syndicate, was a creative design, branding services, and digital production studio, specializing in live action direction, visual effects, animation, motion graphics, and telecine. CafeFX and The Syndicate were held by umbrella corporation ComputerCafe Group, which has also established Sententia Entertainment, a long-form production company.

== History ==
After founding the company in 1993 as Computer Café, Jeff Barnes and David Ebner began working in a small 10-by-10 room inside a local print design studio in Santa Maria. Their initial tools included two Amiga 2000 computers, a VHS deck, and Video Toaster. They used software such as Lightwave 3D, D-Paint, and Imagine 3D. Over the next 17-plus years, Computer Cafe would change its name and grow to one of the top visual effects studios in the world. Their first official employee was Ron Honn who acted as the company's designer and storyboard artist. Soon to follow was VFX supervisor Tom Williamson, whose connection in the LA make-up effects industry helped to launch the group to the feature film market.

The team worked their way up from local to regional and then national commercial and broadcast assignments. "Our first job was to show how a product called Shoe Goo worked." said Ebner "and then SLIME tires, some crazy projects back then." They soon expanded their client base, starting with an initial campaign on 24 spots for Foster's Freeze, and signing their first national contract for Shasta Soda. Shasta was the first US national ad spot to be fully rendered on a desktop PC. The team next steered its focus on broadcast work being represented by Our Gang Productions and studios such as Pittard Sullivan. During that time they produced various opens and TV station packages for both regional and nation clientele. Some projects include, NBC, TNT, Nickelodeon, CBS, Dateline, Entertainment Tonight and the long-running HBO Feature Presentation. Still under the banner of Computer Café, Jeff and David moved into motion picture effects with Clive Barker’s 1995 feature, Lord of Illusions. Even then, Barnes claimed "Everything we made, we put back into the company."

In the late 1990s, Barnes and Ebner were in a position to expand their operations. Interest in a Los Angeles outlet for their CGI feature film work, together with a plan to expand commercially, led them to open their first LA location inside in Virgin Entertainment's 525 Post in Hollywood. A year later they expanded into their own space in Santa Monica where they opened a boutique CGI and compositing studio which housed a staff of 8. In early 2002 they purchased Santa Monica based telecine company (then own by Neil Feldmen and called Pacific Data Post), added CGI effects and compositing, and renamed the company 'The Syndicate.' The Syndicate was a short-form visual effects company, providing Flame finishing suites, full CGI services, and telecine studios, led by the management team of Kenny Solomon, Leslie Sorrentino and Beau Leon.

In 2005, Barnes and Ebner also launched Sentenia Entertainment, a live-action production company. Their first project with Sententia was as Associate Producers for Guillermo del Toro's Academy Award-winning Pan's Labryinth. The following film was Danika starring Marisa Tomei, with Barnes and Ebner serving as the film's executive producers. In the same year, the pair purchased the new CafeFX studio.

The studio closed in 2010 after 17 years in business, citing the recession and the poor economy as the reasons for closure.

== Filmography ==
=== Complete list ===
- 2010 Love Ranch
- 2010 Harry Potter and the Forbidden Journey (short)
- 2010 Alice in Wonderland
- 2010 Shutter Island
- 2009 Whiteout
- 2009 The Final Destination
- 2009 G.I. Joe: The Rise of Cobra
- 2009 Dragonball Evolution
- 2008 Seven Pounds
- 2008 Red Cliff
- 2008 The Happening
- 2008 Speed Racer
- 2008 Iron Man
- 2008 John Adams (TV mini-series)
- 2008 Pathology
- 2008 Street Kings
- 2008 Nim's Island
- 2007 The Mist
- 2007 The Kite Runner
- 2007 Evan Almighty
- 2007 Fantastic Four: Rise of the Silver Surfer
- 2007 Spider-Man 3
- 2007 Ghost Rider
- 2006 Eragon
- 2006 The Good Shepherd
- 2006 The Departed
- 2006 Snakes on a Plane
- 2006 The Fast and the Furious: Tokyo Drift
- 2006 Pan's Labyrinth
- 2006 Scary Movie 4
- 2006 Art School Confidential
- 2006 Underworld: Evolution
- 2005 King Kong
- 2005 Memoirs of a Geisha
- 2005 Zathura
- 2005 Shopgirl
- 2005 Sin City
- 2005 Bad News Bears
- 2005 The Adventures of Sharkboy and Lavagirl
- 2005 Mr. & Mrs. Smith
- 2005 Planet Terror
- 2005 Are We There Yet?
- 2004 Flight of the Phoenix
- 2004 The Aviator
- 2004 Blade: Trinity
- 2004 The Dust Factory
- 2004 Sky Captain and the World of Tomorrow
- 2004 The Terminal
- 2004 Hellboy
- 2003 Master and Commander: The Far Side of the World
- 2003 Gothika
- 2003 Spy Kids 3-D: Game Over
- 2003 The League of Extraordinary Gentlemen
- 2003 Identity
- 2003 The Core
- 2002 Spy Kids 2: The Island of Lost Dreams
- 2002 Halloween: Resurrection
- 2002 Panic Room
- 2001 Impostor
- 2001 The One
- 2001 Megiddo: The Omega Code 2
- 2000 Dracula 2000
- 2000 Battlefield Earth
- 2000 The Crow: Salvation
- 2000 Waking the Dead
- 1999 Fever
- 1998 Armageddon
- 1998 Barney's Great Adventure
- 1998 Chairman of the Board
- 1997 Flubber
- 1997 Star Kid
- 1997 Wishmaster
- 1997 Sprung
- 1995 Lord of Illusions

=== Additional information ===
CafeFX was also the sole provider of visual effects for Seven Pounds, a Sony Pictures Entertainment film starring Will Smith, which opens on December 19, 2008.

CafeFX completed work on approximately 100 shots for the film adaptation of the classic comic book, Ghost Rider, starring Nicolas Cage and Eva Mendes. The studio was called on to introduce the film's main villain—Blackheart—during a storm featuring fire rain and clouds with demon faces.

Snakes on a Plane- As the lead visual effects studio, CafeFX created more than half of the 500 VFX shots, including some 100 photoreal snake shots as well as all of the airline exteriors. CafeFX also handled all the airplane inflight exteriors shots and the Boeing's climactic emergency landing at LAX.

Pan's Labyrinth- Tasked with 300 shots and five months of post-production, the VFX crew worked to bring director Guillermo del Toro's visions to life. The production had very detailed storyboards and the team stuck to those designs "religiously."

== 2009 releases ==
- Dragonball Evolution - 20th Century Fox, release date April 10, 2009
- Night at the Museum: Battle of the Smithsonian - 20th Century Fox, release date May 22, 2009
- Land of the Lost - Universal Pictures, release date June 5, 2009
- Public Enemies - Universal Pictures, release date July 1, 2009
- G.I. Joe: The Rise of Cobra - Paramount Pictures, release date August 7, 2009
- The Final Destination - New Line Cinema, release date August 21, 2009
- Whiteout - Warner Bros., release date September 11, 2009
- Shutter Island - Paramount Pictures, release date February 5, 2010
