= Philippines women's national under-20 football team =

Philippines women's U-20
- Nickname: Filipinas U-20
- Association: Philippine Football Federation
- Confederation: AFC (Asia)
- Sub-confederation: AFF (South-East Asia)
- Head coach: Sinisa Cohadzic
- Captain: Chantelle Maniti
- Home stadium: PFF National Training Center
- FIFA code: PHI
First colours	Second colours

Biggest win
- Philippines 3–0 Guam (Suzhou, China; May 26, 2004)

Biggest defeat
- South Korea 20–0 Philippines (Shah Alam, Malaysia; October 30, 2008)

Asian Cup
- Appearances: 1 (first in 2004)
- Best result: Group Stage (2004)

ASEAN U-19 Women's Championship
- Appearances: 2 (first in 2022)
- Best result: Group Stage (2022, 2023)

The Philippines women's national under-20 football team is the national football team of the Philippines and represents in international football competitions such as AFF U-19 Women's Championship and any other under-20 international football tournaments. The team is controlled by the Philippine Football Federation (PFF), the governing body of football in the Philippines.

== History ==
In 2004, Philippines U-19 first participated in the 2004 AFC U-19 Women's Championship in a 3–0 win against Guam on May 26, 2004. The team however did not advance to qualify in the 2004 FIFA U-19 Women's World Championship.

In 2025, the Philippine Football Federation (PFF) decided not to participate in the 2025 ASEAN U-19 Women's Championship and the 2026 AFC U-20 Women's Asian Cup qualification. The move drew criticism from fans and football community who described it as “wasting the dreams, sacrifices, and efforts” of the youth team and that “the opportunity to build a better pool for the senior team is lost.”

== Results and fixtures ==
Legend

Win Draw Lose

=== 2022 ===
July 25 2022 AFF U-18 Women's Championship	Australia	4–0	Philippines	Palembang
15:30 UTC+7	Prakash 26', 62'; Beier 59'; Lobo 69'	Report		Stadium: Jakabaring Athletic Field; Attendance: 50; Referee: Keomany Phengmeuangkhon (Laos)

July 27 2022 AFF U-18 Women's Championship	Philippines	1–3	Myanmar	Palembang
15:30 UTC+7	Lucban 87'	Report	Myint Aye 33', 90'; Myat Noe 37'	Stadium: Jakabaring Athletic Field; Attendance: 50; Referee: Le Thi Ly (Vietnam)

July 29 2022 AFF U-18 Women's Championship	Malaysia	2–1	Philippines	Palembang
15:30 UTC+7	Irdina 4', 8'	Report	Flanigan 53'	Stadium: Gelora Sriwijaya Stadium; Referee: Plong Pichakara (Cambodia)

=== 2023 ===
March 8 2024 AFC U-20 WCQ - 1st Rd.	China	6–0	Philippines	Vientiane
16:00 UTC+7	Huo Yuexin 9', 36'; Zou Mengyao 22'; Lu Jiayu 69'; Ouyang Yuhuan 74'; Qiao Ruiqi 82'	Report		Stadium: National Stadium KM16; Attendance: 453; Referee: Choki Om (Bhutan)

March 10 2024 AFC U-20 WCQ - 1st Rd.	Philippines	1–0	Laos	Vientiane
19:30 UTC+7	Yap 42'	Report		Stadium: National Stadium KM16; Attendance: 415; Referee: Mahsa Ghorbani (Iran)

March 12 2024 AFC U-20 WCQ - 1st Rd.	Hong Kong	2–2	Philippines	Vientiane
16:00 UTC+7	Lee 24'; Anke Leung 45+1'	Report	Dizon 11'; Pasion 54'	Stadium: National Stadium KM16; Attendance: 252; Referee: Azusa Sugino (Japan)

July 6 2023 AFF U-19 Women's Championship	Philippines	0–6	Thailand	Palembang, Indonesia
19:30		Report	Kantisa 17'; Natcha 19'; Jeena 75' (pen.); Anaphon 82'; Thanchanok 83'; Rinyaphat 84' (pen.)	Stadium: Jakabaring Athletic Field

July 8 2023 AFF U-19 Women's Championship	Myanmar	2–1	Philippines	Palembang, Indonesia
19:30	Zin Moe Pyae 58'; Yin Loon Eain 75'	Report	Alforque 40'	Stadium: Jakabaring Athletic Field

== Personnel ==
Updated as of August 25, 2023

=== Current technical staff ===
Position	Name	Ref.
Head coach	(Australia) Sinisa Cohadzic	
Assistant coaches	(New Zealand) Andrew Durante	
Assistant coaches	(Philippines) Prescila Rubio	
Assistant coaches	(Philippines) Marlon Piñero	
Goalkeeping coach	(Philippines) Anthony Albao	

=== Management ===
Position	Name	Ref.
Team manager	(Philippines) Freddy Gonzalez (interim)	
Assistant team manager	(Philippines) Kevin Padre	

=== Coaching history ===
List of head coaches of the Philippines Women's U-20
Country	Name	Period	Ref.
Philippines	Albert Ryan Lim	2008	
Philippines	Alfredo Estacion	2010	
Philippines	Buda Bautista	2012	
Philippines	Let Dimzon	2021−2023	
Australia	Nahuel Arrarte	2023	
Australia	Sinisa Cohadzic	2023−	

== Players ==
=== Latest squad ===
The following 23 players were selected for the 2024 AFC U-20 Women's Asian Cup qualifiers - First round matches against China, Laos, and Hong Kong.
Caps and goals updated as of 12 March 2023, after the match against Hong Kong.

No.	Pos.	Player	Date of birth (age)	Caps	Goals	Club
1	GK	Kaiya Jota	5 February 2006 (aged 17)	2	0	(United States Soccer Federation) Stanford University
22	GK	Alexis Tan	20 July 2004 (aged 18)	5	0	(Football Australia) Blacktown City
23	GK	Jessa May Lehayan	24 May 2004 (aged 18)	0	0	(Philippine Football Federation) Far Eastern University
4	DF	Rae Tolentino	4 October 2005 (aged 17)	3	0	(Philippine Football Federation) Manila Nomads
10	DF	Journey Hawkins	31 January 2006 (aged 17)	3	0	(United States Soccer Federation) Oxon Hill High School
11	DF	Robyn Dizon		2	1	(United States Soccer Federation) Albion SC Las Vegas GA
14	DF	Ariana Markey	8 June 2007 (aged 15)	3	0	(United States Soccer Federation) Slammers FC ECNL
15	DF	Kylie Yap	15 August 2005 (aged 17)	6	1	(United States Soccer Federation) Penn State Harrisburg
16	DF	Julia Benitez		0	0	(United States Soccer Federation) Match Fit Academy
21	DF	Chantelle Maniti (captain)	3 January 2005 (aged 18)	6	0	(Football Australia) Macarthur Rams
3	MF	Natalie Oca		2	0	(United States Soccer Federation) UC San Diego Tritons
5	MF	Jade Jalique		0	0	(Philippine Football Federation) Tuloy FC
6	MF	Sabine Ramos		3	0	(United States Soccer Federation) Woodbridge High School
8	MF	Sabrina Go		3	0	(United States Soccer Federation) Cal Poly Pomona
12	MF	Tamara Lisser		1	0	(Canadian Soccer Association) Pickering FC
19	MF	Isabella Pasion		3	1	(Philippine Football Federation) Stallion Laguna
20	MF	Jonalyn Lucban	23 September 2004 (aged 18)	5	1	(Philippine Football Federation) Tuloy FC
2	FW	Jada Bicierro		1	0	(Philippine Football Federation) Miriam College
7	FW	Elaine Pimentel		3	0	(United States Soccer Federation) Beach FC
9	FW	Chayse Ying	1 September 2005 (aged 17)	3	0	(United States Soccer Federation) University of Notre Dame
13	FW	Jodi Banzon	8 July 2006 (aged 16)	1	0	(Philippine Football Federation) Ateneo de Cebu
17	FW	Isabella Flanigan (co-captain)	22 January 2005 (aged 18)	6	1	(Football Australia) Box Hill United
18	FW	Ariana Salvador		3	0	(United States Soccer Federation) Los Angeles FC

=== Recent call-ups ===
The following players have been called up for the Philippines U-20 within the past 12 months.

Pos.	Player	Date of birth (age)	Caps	Goals	Club	Latest call-up

== Competitive record ==
=== FIFA U-20 Women's World Cup ===
The Philippines has never qualified for the FIFA U-20 Women's World Cup. It didn't attempt to qualify for the inaugural FIFA U-19 Women's World Cup in 2002 with its non-participation at the 2002 AFC U-19 Women's Championship which also served as the Asian qualifiers of the U-20 World Cup. The national team first attempted to qualify for the succeeding editions of the tournament from 2004.

The Philippines' FIFA U-20 Women's World Cup record
Year	Result	Position	GP	W	D*	L	GF	GA	GD
(Canada) 2002	Did not enter								
(Thailand) 2004	Did not qualify								
(Russia) 2006	Did not enter								
(Chile) 2008	Did not enter								
(Germany) 2010	Did not qualify								
(Japan) 2012	Did not qualify								
(Canada) 2014	Did not qualify								
(Papua New Guinea) 2016	Did not enter								
(France) 2018	Withdrew								
(Costa Rica) 2022	Did not enter								
(Colombia) 2024	Did not qualify								
(Poland) 2026	Did not enter								
Total	0/12		-	-	-	-	-	-	-

*Draws include knockout matches decided on penalty kicks.

=== AFC U-20 Women's Asian Cup ===
The has competed in one edition of the AFC U-20 Women's Asian Cup, the top tournament for women's national teams under the age of 20, organized by members of the Asian Football Confederation. The Philippines first competed in 2004, when the tournament was still known as the "AFC U-19 Women's Championship".

The Philippines' AFC U-20 Women's Asian Cup record
Year	Result	GP	W	D*	L	GF	GA	GD
(India) 2002	Did not enter							
(China) 2004	Group Stage	3	1	0	2	4	8	−4
(Malaysia) 2006	Did not enter							
(China) 2007	Did not enter							
(China) 2009	Did not qualify							
(Vietnam) 2011	Did not qualify							
(China) 2013	Did not qualify							
(China) 2015	Did not enter							
(China) 2017	Withdrew							
(Thailand) 2019	Did not enter							
(Uzbekistan) 2022	Cancelled due to COVID-19 pandemic							
(Uzbekistan) 2024	Did not qualify							
(Thailand) 2026	Did not enter							
Total	1/11	3	1	0	2	4	8	−4

=== ASEAN U-19 Women's Championship ===
The Philippines' ASEAN U-19 Women's Championship record
Year	Result	GP	W	D*	L	GF	GA	GD
(Thailand) 2014	Did not enter							
(Indonesia) 2022	Group stage	3	0	0	3	2	9	−7
(Indonesia) 2023	Group stage	3	0	0	3	1	8	−7
(Vietnam) 2025	Did not enter							
Total	2/4	6	0	0	6	3	17	−14

== Head-to-head record ==
As of 12 March 2023, after the match against Hong Kong.

Positive Record Neutral Record Negative Record

Team	Pld	W	D	L	GF	GA	GD	Confederation
Australia	1	0	0	1	0	4	−4	AFC
China	2	0	0	2	0	12	−12	AFC
Chinese Taipei	1	0	0	1	0	1	−1	AFC
Guam	1	1	0	0	3	0	+3	AFC
Hong Kong	1	1	1	0	4	2	+2	AFC
Jordan	1	0	0	1	0	2	−2	AFC
Laos	1	1	0	0	1	0	+1	AFC
Malaysia	1	0	0	1	1	2	−1	AFC
Myanmar	3	0	0	4	1	20	−19	AFC
Singapore	1	1	0	0	2	1	+1	AFC
South Korea	2	0	0	2	1	22	−21	AFC
Uzbekistan	1	0	0	1	0	4	−4	AFC
Vietnam	1	0	0	1	0	11	−11	AFC

== See also ==
- Football in the Philippines
- Philippines women's national football team
- Philippines women's national under-17 football team
