= Chantelle Maniti =

Filipino footballer (born 2005)

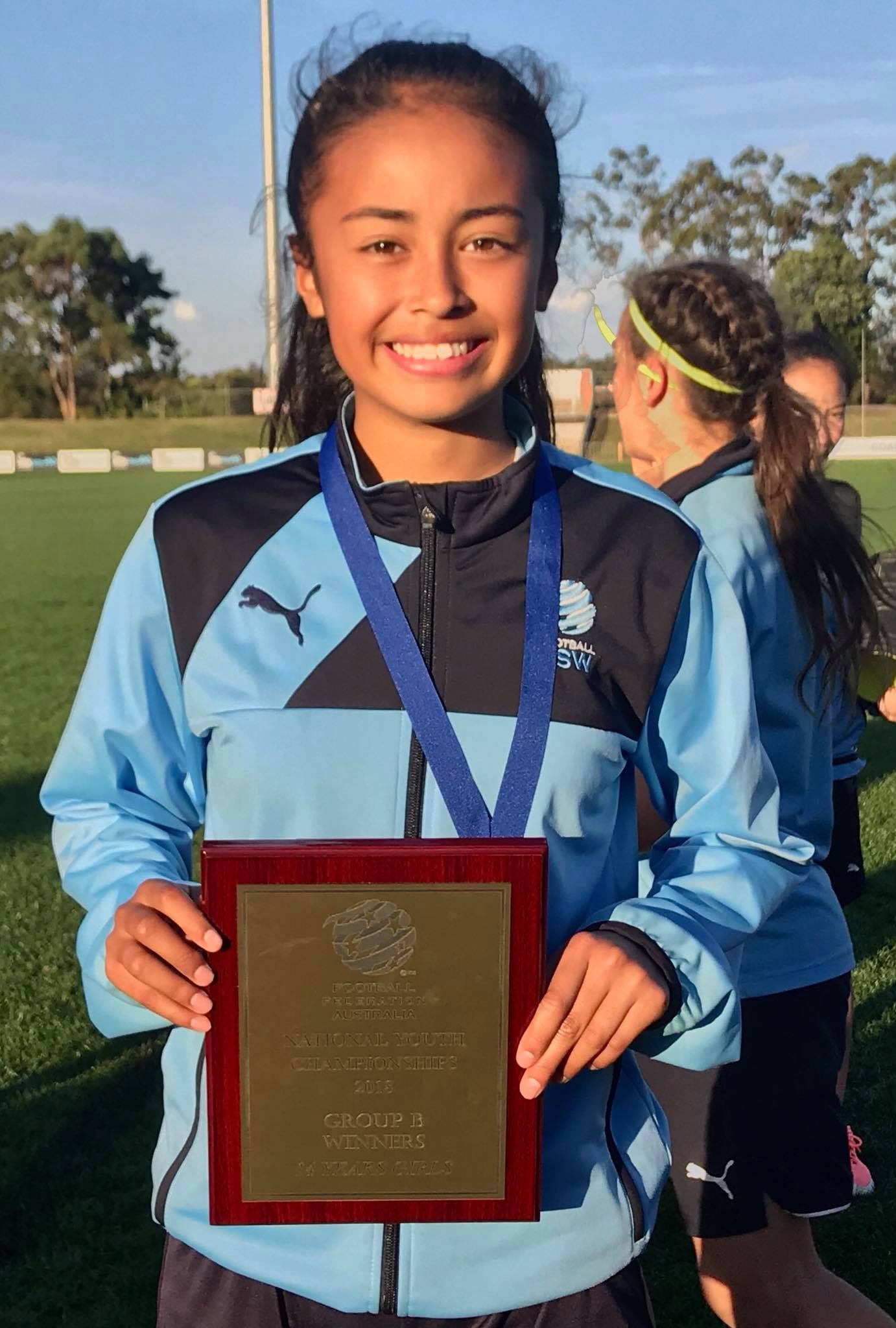
- Maniti in 2019

Personal information
- Full name: Chantelle Lourdes Mariona Maniti
- Date of birth: January 3, 2005 (age 21)
- Place of birth: Wetherill Park, New South Wales, Australia
- Position: Defender

Team information
- Current team: Macarthur Rams

Youth career
- 2011: Wetherill Park Westerners
- –2017: Sydney United
- 2017–: Football New South Wales Institute
- 2023-2024: Blacktown Spartans 2025 Macarthur Rams

International career^{‡}
Years	Team	Apps	(Gls)
2022–	Philippines U20	3	(0)
2022–	Philippines	10	(0)
Medal record
Women's football
Representing the Philippines
ASEAN Women's Championship
Winner	2022 Philippines	Team
Southeast Asian Games
Bronze medal – third place	2021 Vietnam	Team
- ‡ National team caps and goals as of 13:00; 16 December 2022 (UTC)

Chantelle Lourdes Mariona Maniti (born January 3, 2005) is a professional footballer who plays as a defender for Macarthur Rams and the Philippines women's national team.

== Early life ==
Maniti was born in Wetherill Park, Australia, the third of four children to Filipino and El Salvadoran parents.

== Career ==
=== Youth ===
Maniti started playing football when she was six years old. She played youth football at Wetherill Park Westerners, Sydney United, and Football New South Wales Institute, her current club.

== International career ==
Since Maniti was born in Australia to a Filipino father and an El Salvadoran mother, she was eligible to represent Australia, Philippines, and El Salvador at the international level.

=== Philippines U18 ===
Maniti was included in the 27-player line up of the Philippines U18 for the 2022 AFF U-18 Women's Championship in Palembang, Indonesia.

Maniti was named as captain in her debut for Philippines U18 in a 4–0 defeat against Australia U18.

=== Philippines ===
Maniti was included in the Philippines squad for a month-long training camp in Australia. The training camp was part of the national team's preparation for the 2021 Southeast Asian Games held in Hanoi, Vietnam.

She made her debut for the Philippines in a 7–2 win against Fiji, coming in as a substitute replacing Jessica Miclat in the 81st minute.

== Personal life ==
Maniti's older brother Jacob is also a footballer and a current Philippines U23 player. Their younger brother Michael is also part of the national team; he plays for the U16 team.

== Honours ==
=== International ===
==== Philippines ====
- Southeast Asian Games third place: 2021
- ASEAN Women's Championship: 2022
