= Birdhouse Skateboards =

American skateboard company

- Type: Private
- Founded: 1992; 34 years ago (as Birdhouse Projects)
- Founders: Tony Hawk; Per Welinder
- Headquarters: Vista, California, U.S.
- Products: Skateboard equipment, apparel, accessories, videos
- Owner: Tony Hawk
- Website: birdhouseskateboards.com

Birdhouse Skateboards (originally Birdhouse Projects) is an American skateboard company formed by ex-Powell Peralta professional skateboarders Tony Hawk and Per Welinder in 1992.

Birdhouse makes decks and wheels, as well as clothing and accessories.

== History ==
After the skateboard boom of the late 1980s had died, former Powell Peralta professional and freestyle skateboarder Per Welinder wanted to stay involved with skateboarding by starting a company. Welinder had originally asked Powell Peralta pro skateboarder Lance Mountain to be his equal partner in the venture. Mountain declined as he only wanted to start a skateboard company if he had 100% ownership. Mountain later founded The Firm Skateboards (now defunct). Welinder later asked another Powell Peralta pro skateboarder Tony Hawk to be 50-50 partners in this new skateboard company. Hawk gladly accepted as he felt his time in skateboarding was nearly over due to the lack of interest in vert skating caused by the popularity of street skating. Welinder and Hawk decided to name their new skateboard company Birdhouse Projects, Birdhouse being a reference to Hawk's nickname Birdman.

Birdhouse is prominently featured in the Tony Hawk's video game series, and is one of five skate teams which the player can join in Tony Hawk's Underground. In 2026, Birdhouse released Birdhouse 2026 Promo - The Nest on RIDE Channel.

=== Skate Team ===
- Tony Hawk
- Aaron Homoki
- David Loy
- Lizzie Armanto
- Shawn Hale
- Elliot Sloan
- Reese Salken
- Felipe Nunes
- Reese Nelson
- Gui Khury
- Tom Schaar
- Jake Braun
- Tate Carew
- Ash Wilcomes
- Lilly Erickson
- Greyson Fletcher
- Clyde Singleton
- Bryson Farrill
- Ethan Campos
- Katelyn West
- Roman Pabich

=== Former ===
- Clint Walker
- Jeremy Klein
- Willy Santos
- Steve Berra
- Matt Beach
- Andrew Reynolds
- Heath Kirchart
- Rick McCrank
- Brian Sumner
- Jeff Lenoce
- Shaun White
- Riley Hawk
- Bucky Lasek
- Mike Frazier
- Paul Zitzer
- Ocean Howell
- Brent Marks
- Donny Barley
- Ben Raybourn
- Kevin Staab
- Matt Ball
- Mike Davis
- Jim Greco
- Vinny Vegas
