= Grind Session =

2000 video game

- North American box art
- Developer: Shaba Games
- Publisher: Sony Computer Entertainment
- Platform: PlayStation
- Release: NA: May 23, 2000; EU: August 25, 2000
- Genre: Sports
- Modes: Single-player, multiplayer

Grind Session is a 2000 skateboarding video game developed by Shaba Games and published by Sony Computer Entertainment for the PlayStation. It was Shaba Games' debut video game, and they would later develop installments in Activision's Tony Hawk's Pro Skater series.

== Characters ==
Grind Session features six professional skaters and nine hidden characters. The player also has the ability to choose between four custom skaters, and edit their tricks and names.

Pro Skaters:

- Cara-Beth Burnside
- Daewon Song
- Ed Templeton
- John Cardiel
- Pigpen
- Willy Santos

Hidden Characters:

- Skator (a robot skateboarder)
- Rex (a dragon-human hybrid)
- Hang man (a stick figure)
- Stanley (an alien)
- Dave Carnie (from Big Brother)
- Demon
- Stinger (a female alien)
- Golgotha
- Master Ao

== Soundtrack ==
- Black Flag - Rise Above
- Cornelius - Galaxie Express (69 Mix)
- Dr. Octagon - Blue Flowers
- GZA - Publicity
- Jurassic 5 - Jayou
- KRS-One - Out for Fame
- Man or Astro-man? - Television Fission
- NOFX - Linoleum
- Sonic Youth - In the Mind of the Bourgeois Reader
- The X-Ecutioners - Raida's Theme (Remix)
- Zen Guerrilla - Empty Heart

== Locations ==
- Da Banks (NYC)
- S.F. Mission
- Burnside
- Slam City Jam
- Atlanta
- PlayStation Park London
- Detroit
- Huntingdon

== Reception ==
Reception

Aggregate score
Aggregator	Score
GameRankings	78%

Review scores
Publication	Score
AllGame	3.5/5
CNET Gamecenter	8/10
Electronic Gaming Monthly	5.5/10 (Note: Three critics of Electronic Gaming Monthly gave the game each a score of 6/10, 5.5/10, and 5/10.)
Game Informer	6.75/10
GameFan	83%
GamePro	4.5/5
GameRevolution	B−
GameSpot	9.1/10
IGN	7.6/10
Next Generation	2/5
Official U.S. PlayStation Magazine	4/5

The game received favorable reviews according to the review aggregation website GameRankings. Nearly six months after the game's release, however, Daniel Erickson of NextGen said, "If you've already played out Tony Hawk's Pro Skater, go pick up Street Sk8er 2. At least that plays differently."

The game was a runner-up for GameSpot's annual "Best Game Music" and "Best Sports Game (Alternative)" awards among console games, both of which went to Chrono Cross and Tony Hawk's Pro Skater 2. It was also a runner-up for the "Best Extreme Sports Game" award at the Official U.S. PlayStation Magazine 2000 Editors' Awards, which went to SSX.
