= Jacob Maniti =

Filipino footballer (born 2002)

Personal information
- Full name: Jacob Francis Mariona Maniti
- Date of birth: 16 October 2002 (age 24)
- Place of birth: Wetherill Park, Australia
- Height: 1.72 m (5 ft 8 in)
- Position: Central midfielder

Team information
- Current team: Blacktown City
- Number: 22

Youth career
- 2010–2013: NSW South South Team
- 2013–2014: Marconi Stallions
- 2014–2015: Mounties Wanderers
- 2015–2017: Mt Druitt Town Rangers
- 2018–2020: Melbourne Victory

Senior career*
Years	Team	Apps	(Gls)
2020–2021	Blacktown City	1	(0)
2021–2022	Bulls FC Academy	2	(0)
2022–2023	ADT	8	(2)
2023	Hobro IK II		
2023–	Blacktown City	23	(0)

International career
2016	Philippines U14		
2018	Philippines U16		
2019	Philippines U19		
2022–2023	Philippines U23	6	(0)
- * Club domestic league appearances and goals as of 21 July 2024

Jacob Maniti (born 16 October 2002) is a Filipino professional footballer who plays as a central midfielder for National Premier Leagues NSW club Blacktown City. Born in Australia, he represented the Philippines at youth international level.

== Career ==
Born in Western Sydney to parents of Filipino and El Salvador heritage he was signed to the academy of A-League Men club Melbourne Victory, following strong performances as a young player in local district competitions.

Maniti would travel to the Philippines and represent the Azkals Development Team in the Philippines Football League, where his first goal would be a penalty against Maharlika Taguig, which rescued the Azkals a 1–1 draw.

Following a short term move to Hobro IK, Maniti returned to Australia and re-signed with Blacktown City in the NPL1 for the 2024 National Premier Leagues NSW season.

== International career ==
Due to his heritage, Maniti is eligible to represent Australia, El Salvador and the Philippines. He was called up to the ASEAN U-19 Boys Championship while with the Melbourne Victory academy.

Maniti was called up to the Philippines U-23s for the 2022 AFF U-23 Championship.

== Personal life ==
Maniti is the brother of Philippines women's national football team player Chantelle Maniti and Philippines national under-16 football team player Michael Maniti.
