= Clyde Singleton =

American skateboarder and writer

- Born: Jacksonville, Florida, U.S.
- Other name: Piff Huxtable
- Occupations: skateboarder, writer, chef
- Years active: 1994–present

Clyde Singleton is an American regular-footed professional skateboarder, writer, and chef from Jacksonville, Florida.

== Skateboarding ==
Growing up skating, Singleton was inspired by African-American skaters Rodney Smith, Ron Allen, and Steve Steadham who were starting their own brands at the time. Singleton recalls watching Fred Reeves win the NSA Finals, the largest skate contest at the time. Singleton watched the emergence of street skating, taking inspiration from many skaters including Ray Barbee, Ron Chatman, and Sal Barbier. Singleton met Harold Hunter and Keennan Milton at Eastern Vert Skatepark in North Carolina.

=== Professional skateboarding career ===
Singleton went pro in 1994.

Singleton appeared in the 2002 film Jackass: The Movie during a skit called The Handrail – where Johnny Knoxville attempts to grind a long rail on a skateboard, with Eric Koston also making a cameo appearance. Singleton also made a cameo appearance in the sequels Jackass Number Two (2006) and Jackass 2.5 (2007).

In 2007, Singleton directed the video Minority Report produced by The Skateboard Mag featuring many notable skateboarders including Darrell Stanton, Nyjah Huston, Willy Santos, Mike Rosa, Jahmal Williams and others.

Year	Skate video Parts & Appearances
1992	The Acme Skateboard Video
1995	World Industries – 20 Shot Sequence
1995	411VM – Issue 12
1996	World Industries/Blind/101 – Trilogy
1998	Big Brother – Number Two
1999	411VM – Issue 35
2001	Big Brother – crap
2007	MINORITY REPORT – The Skateboard Mag

== Writing ==
Throughout his skateboarding career, Singleton has written. He wrote an acclaimed skate-blog “The Chronicles of Piff Huxtable." He wrote for the skateboard magazine Big Brother. In the 2010s, Singleton wrote for Vice Magazine.

== Filmography ==
=== Films ===
- Jackass: The Movie (2002)
- Jackass Number Two (2006)
- The Man Who Souled the World (documentary, 2007)
- Jackass 2.5 (2007)
