= Ron Chatman =

American skateboarder

Personal information
- Full name: Ron Chatman
- Born: September 30, 1971 (age 54) Long Beach, California, U.S.

Sport
- Country: USA
- Sport: Skateboarding

Ron Chatman (born August 30, 1971) is a goofy-footed American skateboarder.

== Skateboarding ==
Chatman was an early rider for World Industries; as well as team captain. Chatman was featured in the 1989 World Industries video: Rubbish Heap, alongside skaters Jeremy Klein, Mike Vallely, Chris Pastras, Steve Rocco, and others. He also rode for Tracker Trucks. After World Industries, Chatman rode for Milk, ATM Click, and 60/40.
