= Isabella Pasion =

Filipino footballer (born 2006)

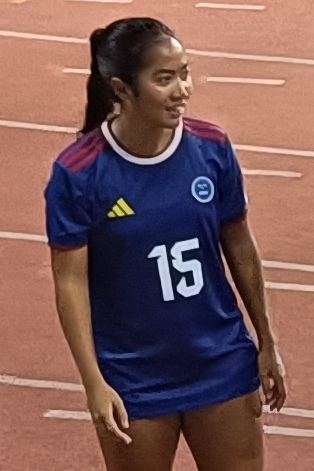
- Pasion with the Philippines in 2025

Personal information
- Full name: Isabella Edquilane Pasion
- Date of birth: July 14, 2006 (age 20)
- Place of birth: Frisco, Texas, U.S.
- Height: 5 ft 0 in (1.53 m)
- Position: Midfielder

Youth career
- Lebanon Trail Blazers

Senior career*
Years	Team	Apps	(Gls)
2024–	Stallion Laguna	9	(0)

International career^{‡}
2023	Philippines U-20	3	(1)
2023–	Philippines	26	(0)
Medal record
Women's football
Representing the Philippines
Southeast Asian Games
Gold medal – first place	2025 Thailand	Team
- * Club domestic league appearances and goals as of April 12, 2025 ‡ National team caps and goals as of September 14, 2026

Isabella Edquilane Pasion (born July 14, 2006) is a professional footballer who plays as a midfielder. Born in the United States, she represents the Philippines at international level.

Selected as a reserve, she is one of the four 16-year-old players selected for the 2023 Women's World Cup. She has also played for the Philippines women's national under-20 team.

== Early life ==
Pasion was born on November 28, 2006, in North Texas. Pasion attends Lebanon Trail High School in Frisco, Texas.

== Career ==
Pasion is a member of the Philippines women's national under-20 football team. In early 2023, Pasion played in the AFC women's under-20 qualifiers, where she was featured in three matches. She scored in their match against the Hong Kong national under-20 football team.

In April 2023, Pasion was called up to the Philippines women's national football team for the Asian Football Confederation Olympic qualifiers. The coaching staff saw her performance at the under-20 matches, which led to her inclusion on the team. She played in five qualifying matches. At the age of 16, Pasion was selected for the Philippines women's national football team for the 2023 FIFA Women's World Cup as a reserve. She was named one of the team's three reserve players. She trained with the team while in New Zealand as a reserve player.

Pasion is a midfielder.

== Honors ==
Stallion Laguna

- PFF Women's Cup: 2024

Philippines

- Southeast Asian Games: 2025
