= Stefanie Åkesson =

Swedish professional skateboarder (born 1964)

Personal information
- Nickname: Lillis
- Born: Stefanie Åkesson; April 21, 1964 (age 62) Falun, Sweden.
- Occupation(s): Skateboarder, sales person, designer
- Years active: 1981–present
- Spouse(s): Anu Paananen 1985–2001; Angela Lamadrid 2001–2025
- Children: Mia Åkesson, Bastian Åkesson
- Website: stefanieakesson.com

Sport
- Country: Sweden
- Sport: Skateboarding
- Event: Freestyle
- Turned pro: 1987
- Updated on November 01, 2024

Stefanie Åkesson is a Swedish freestyle skateboarder. She is the founder of the International Network for Flatland freestyle Skateboarding (INFFS) and of Reverse Freestyle Skateboards, as well as the co-founder of the World Freestyle Skateboard Association (WFSA).

Åkesson started to skateboard in 1978 and won her first Swedish Skateboard Championships in 1983. Won her first European Championships in 1987, the World Championships in 2000 (tie with Kevin Harris), and the European Championships once again in 2005. In 2011 she won the World Championships again.

Stefanie enters contests, does demos, shows and clinics all over the world. She was part of the theater group Skokloster Teatersällskap as a lead actor and work part-time as a sales person for Stadium .

She has her own pro signature model from Moonshine Skateboards .

== Contest highlights ==
- 1st World Championships 2011, Malmö, Sweden
- 1st World Championships 2000, San Francisco, USA (tie)
- 2nd World Championships 2007, Vancouver, Canada
- 2nd World Championships 2006, England
- 2nd World Championships 2005, São Paulo, Brazil
- 2nd World Championships 2003, Germany
- 2nd World Championships 2001, USA
- 2nd World Round Up 2023, Vancouver, Canada
- 2nd U2R 2023, France
- 2nd NASS 2009, South and West Showground, England
- 2nd U2R 2023, Saint Yan, France
- 2nd Grand Prix Trocadero 2008, Paris, France
- 2nd Spon On Summer Classic 2008, Glendale, USA
- 2nd Venice Beach Contest & Jam 2010, Venice Beach, USA
- 2nd UK Round Up 2015, England
- 3rd World Championships 2018, Tokyo, Japan
- 3rd World Championships 2017, Stockholm, Sweden
- 3rd World Championships 2008, Brazil
- 3rd European Championships 2021, Brandenburg, Germany (world open contest, Lillis second best European)
- 3rd Japan Freestyle Skateboard Contest 2022, Chiba, Japan
- 1st Spot On Summer Classic II 2009, Glendale, California
- 1st Reverse Freestyle Open 2003, Sweden
- 1st European Championships 2005, England
- 1st European Championships 1987, Sweden
- 3rd European Championships 2021, Brandenburg, Germany
- 1st SKF Euro Cup 2990, Sweden
- 1st Chit Challenge, New Jersey 2001
- 1st LA Barrio Games, Los Angeles 2001
- 1st Swedish Championships 15 times (or more, Stefanie doesn’t remember how many.)
- 1st Swedish Cup, several times
- 3rd All Japan Freestyle Skateboard Contest 2012, Tokyo, Japan
- 3rd Paderborn World Cup 2009, Paderborn, Germany
- 4th All Japan Freestyle Skateboard Contest 2022, Tokyo, Japan
- 4th All Japan Freestyle Skateboard Contest 2023, Osaka, Japan
- 4th Stockholm Freestyle 2016, Stockholm Sweden
- 4th World Round Up 2012, Vancouver, Canada
- 5th World Round Up 2015, Vancouver, Canada
- 6th World Round Up 2017, Vancouver, Canada
- 6th World Round Up 2016, Vancouver, Canada
- 6th World Round Up 2013, Vancouver, Canada

Guinness World Record 2008: Most Dogwalks in 1 minute.

Guinness World Record 2006: Longest one wheelie on flat, 39 meters. Update!: Guinness World Record 2007: Longest one wheelie on flat, 68 meters and 54 centimeters.

== Sponsors ==
- Moonshine Skateboards
- Seismic Skate Systems

== Early life ==
Stefanie Åkesson was born April 21, 1964, in Falun, Sweden to Britt-Inger and Kjell Åkesson. She was assigned male at birth, was given the name Stefan and struggled with gender dysphoria throughout life, and finally in 2023 started a medical transition.

She was raised in Falun and in 1992 moved to Idealbyn Skokloster. She has a younger brother, Peter, that lives in Thailand and work as a horseback riding instructor. Stefanie has two kids and joke "they are older than me now".
