= Isabella Flanigan =

Filipino footballer (born 2005)

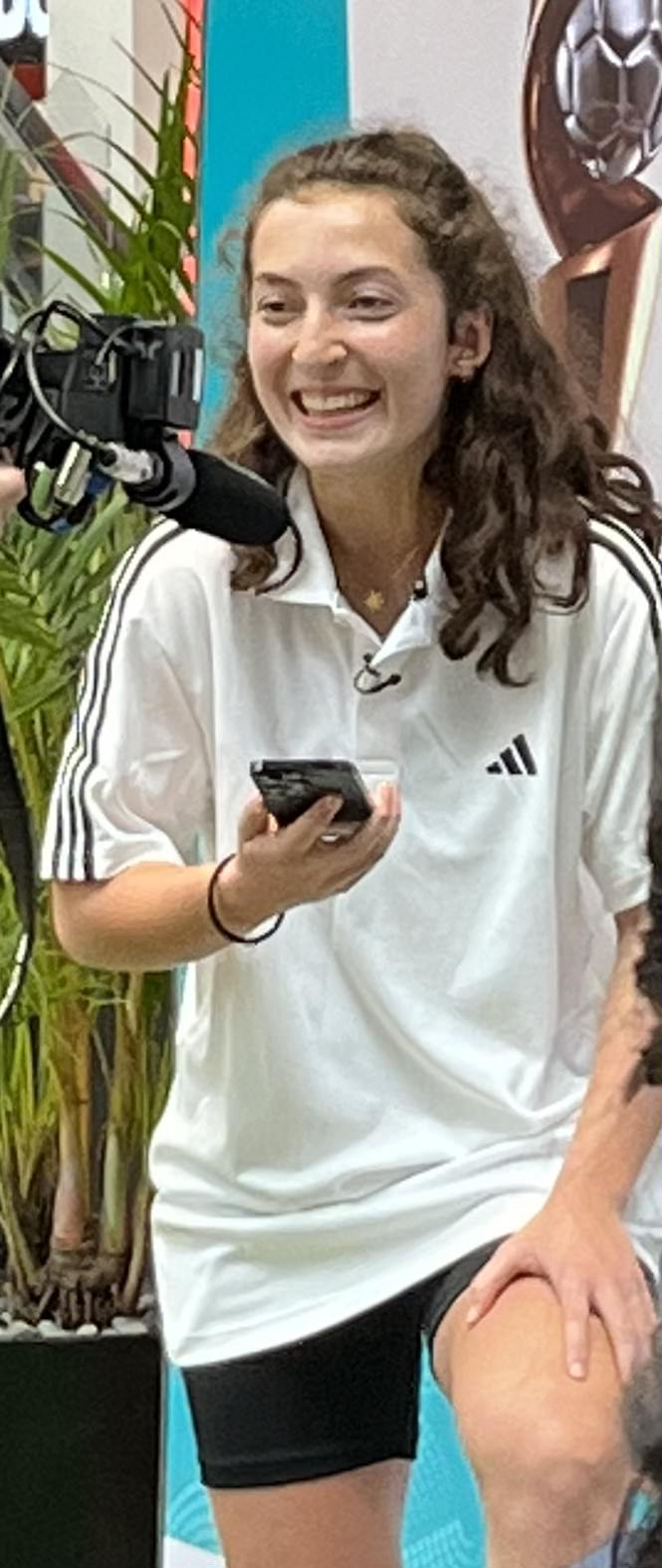
- Flanigan in 2023

Personal information
- Full name: Isabella Victoria Sola Flanigan
- Date of birth: February 22, 2005 (age 21)
- Place of birth: Fairmont, West Virginia, U.S.
- Height: 5 ft 5 in (1.64 m)
- Position: Forward

Team information
- Current team: Cockburn Wolves

Youth career
- Montverde Eagles
- 2023–2024: CE Europa

Senior career*
Years	Team	Apps	(Gls)
2024	CE Europa	5	(0)
2025	Box Hill United	5	(1)

International career^{‡}
2022	Philippines U18	3	(1)
2023	Philippines U20	6	(1)
2022–	Philippines	30	(3)
2025–	Philippines (futsal)	11	(2)
Medal record
Representing the Philippines
AFF Women's Championship
Winner	2022 Philippines	Team
Southeast Asian Games
Bronze medal – third place	2021 Vietnam	Team
- * Club domestic league appearances and goals as of April 12, 2025 ‡ National team caps and goals as of November 27, 2025

Isabella Victoria Sola Flanigan (born February 22, 2005) is a professional footballer who plays for Australian futsal club Cockburn Wolves. Born in the United States, she represents the Philippines at the international level. She also represents the country in futsal, co-captaining the national team.

== Early life ==
Flanigan was born in Fairmont, West Virginia, United States. Her mother is Filipina. She has attended Montverde Academy where she played for the school's girls' football (soccer) team.

== International career ==
=== Philippines U18 ===
Flanigan was included in the 27-player line up of the Philippines U18 for the 2022 AFF U-18 Women's Championship in Palembang, Indonesia.

She made her debut for Philippines U18 in a 4–0 defeat against Australia U18. She scored her first goal for the Philippines U18 in a 2–1 defeat against Malaysia U18.

=== Philippines ===
Flanigan represented the Philippines at the 2022 AFC Women's Asian Cup and the 2023 FIFA Women's World Cup.

=== Philippine futsal ===
Flanigan was called up to become part of the Philippine national futsal team that took part at the 2025 AFC Women's Futsal Asian Cup qualifiers. She scored a goal in her futsal debut for the Philippines' 4–1 opener win against Kuwait. Flanigan played at the inaugural 2025 FIFA Futsal Women's World Cup in the Philippines.

== International goals ==
=== Football ===
Scores and results list the Philippines' goal tally first.

#	Date	Venue	Opponent	Score	Result	Competition
1.	April 11, 2022	Wanderers Football Park, Sydney, Australia	Fiji	6–0	8–0	Friendly
2.	May 9, 2022	Cẩm Phả Stadium, Cẩm Phả, Vietnam	Cambodia	1–0	5–0	2021 Southeast Asian Games
3.	July 6, 2022	Rizal Memorial Stadium, Manila	Singapore	1–0	7–0	2022 AFF Women's Championship

=== Futsal ===
No.	Date	Venue	Opponent	Score	Result	Competition	Ref.
1.	January 11, 2025	Yunusobod Sport Complex, Tashkent	Kuwait	2–0	4–1	2025 AFC Women's Futsal Asian Cup qualification	
2.	January 13, 2025	Yunusobod Sport Complex, Tashkent	Uzbekistan	1–0	3–3	2025 AFC Women's Futsal Asian Cup qualification	

== Honors ==
Philippines

- Southeast Asian Games third place: 2021
- AFF Women's Championship: 2022
