= Joe Humeres =

American professional skateboarder

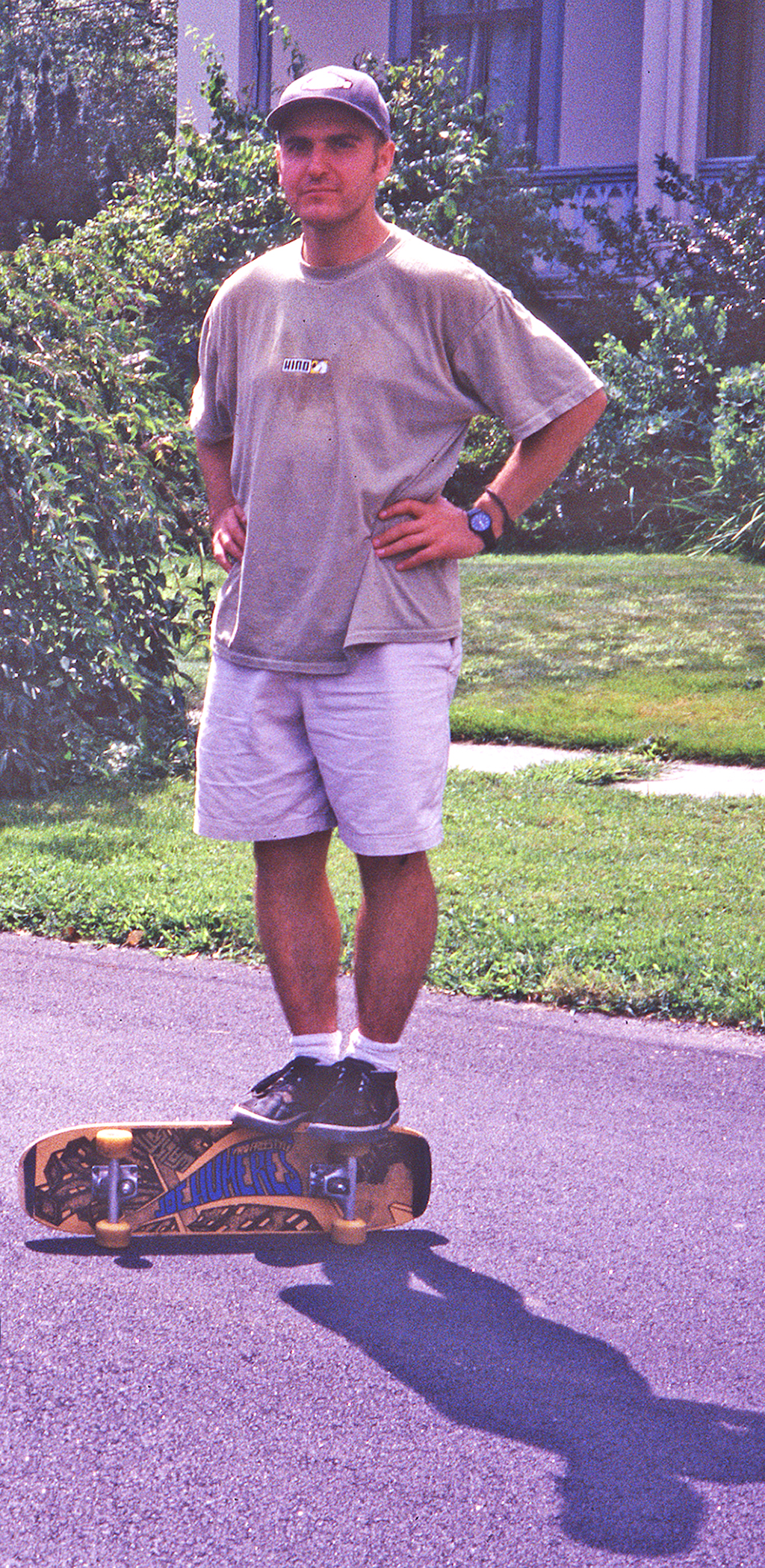
- Joe Humeres circa 1997
- Born: 1965 (age 59–60)
- Occupation(s): Creative Director, skateboarder
- Years active: 1975–present
- Title: 1988 Amateur Freestyle Skateboarding Champion

Joe Humeres (born 1965 in Santiago, Chile) is a United States National champion freestyle skateboarder. In 1988, he became New York City's first professional skateboarder. Humeres appears in the 2009 documentary Deathbowl to Downtown and the book FULL BLEED, both of which are about the history of New York City skateboarding. He appears prominently in the 2022 film VIRGIN BLACKTOP: A New York Skate Odyssey.

Humeres grew up in Nyack, New York, and started skateboarding at age 11. In 1977 he and other kids from Nyack and nearby Hudson River towns formed a group of skateboarders called the "Wizards" which competed in contests in the Northeast, performed at exhibitions in the suburbs of New York City, and frequented Skate-Away Skateboard Arena, an indoor skatepark in Nanuet, New York.

== Amateur ==
Joe Humeres is the titleholder of the United States National Skateboard Association's (now known as World Cup of Skateboarding) 1988 Amateur Freestyle Skateboarding competition held in Phoenix, Arizona, effectively crowning him the best amateur freestyle skateboarder in the world at that time. He is also the 1987 and 1988 freestyle titleholder of the Eastern Skateboard Championships, the only person to win two consecutive years.

== Professional ==
In 1988 Humeres became New York's first professional skateboarder appearing in commercials, TV shows, advertisements, narrating skateboard videos and writing magazine articles for Thrasher magazine. In the June 1989 issue of Transworld Skateboarding he was featured as a rising talent in Check Out. He appeared along with Harold Hunter and other skateboarders in an October 1989 Thrasher magazine photo essay that helped put New York City on the national skateboarding map. Joe Humeres has four signature skateboard decks (pro models) manufactured by companies Walker and Decomposed. He was part owner of "Skate N.Y.C." skateshop next to Tompkins Square Park, New York City.

== Mullaly Skate Park ==
In 1990 Joe Humeres and Victor Ortiz built the ramps for Mullaly Park in the Bronx, New York - the first Parks and recreation in New York City sanctioned skatepark. A New York Times magazine article is credited with inspiring private donations that secured funding to complete the park.
