= Brian Sumner =

British skateboarder

Brian Sumner is a British skateboarder, Christian pastor and a travelling evangelist, originally from Liverpool, England. He came to the United States at the age of 15 to pursue a career as a professional skateboarder. He resides in Huntington Beach, California. Sumner received notoriety in the UK for winning contests with his stair/handrail skating. After finishing his schooling and six months of art college in Liverpool, he made his way to the US at the age of 16 to further his skateboarding career.

== Early career ==
Brian turned professional at the age of 19 and has skateboarded for some of the biggest companies including Birdhouse, Airwalk, Adio, Independent, TSA, Volcom, Analog, Rocket Wheels, Fender Guitars, Truth Soul Armor, Reliance Skateboards and Airspeed shoes.

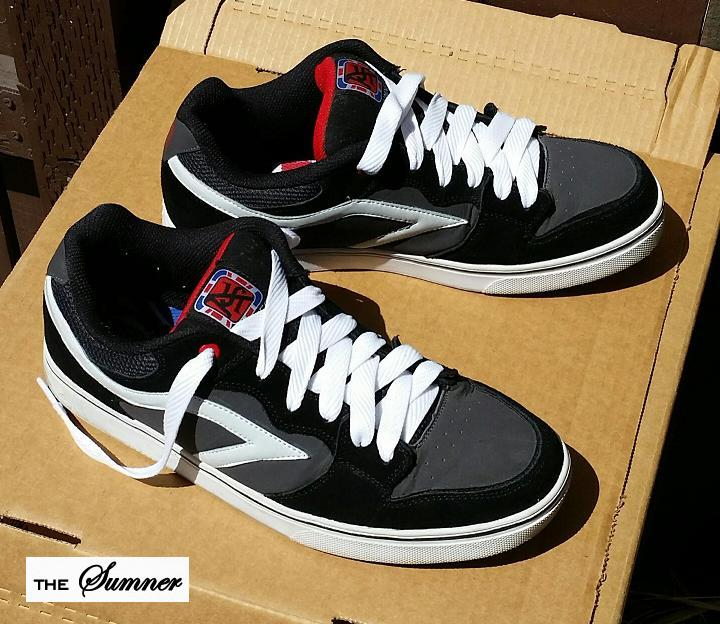
The "Sumner" skate shoe designed by Brian Sumner and named after him

Brian made his US debut in the skate video The End. Brian has been in other films including One Step Beyond by Adio shoes, on many 411's and on Baker videos. Brian spent many summers travelling the US on Tony Hawks Gigantic skate park tour which aired throughout America on television, and helped present skateboarding to a new generation of skateboarders.

== Height of career ==
In 2001, Brian wrote, produced, directed, filmed and edited an instructional skateboard video called, "The Tao of Skateboarding." It starred skaters from Paul Rodriguez, Ed Templeton, Bam Margera, Andrew Reynolds, Jim Greco, Kevin Long, Jeremy Rogers and more. He became known for his dyed black hair and fitted clothes, as he took flip tricks to rails and stairs while skating to fast music. In 2003 Brian was a stunt double for Adam Brody in the film Grind and also made a cameo appearance as himself. In 2004 he appeared in Sleepover where he jumped over a fountain at USC with a rubber mask on. At this time he also worked in music videos for Reggie and the full effect, Saves the Day and OPM. Working with Adio, the Brian shoe with his staple Union Jack graphic sold thousands of pairs around the world. He also had endorsement deals for video games, tech decks, wheels, boards, pants, stickers and trading cards.

== Finding Christianity ==
Brian and Tracy divorced after just a few years and Brian began to question life and purpose. After separating from Tracy, dealing with anger management and facing hard times, Brian began to study the different religions of the world. After doing community service at a Christian thrift store, and running into Christian Hosoi who had been in prison for five years, Brian soon ended up repenting of his sins to Jesus Christ and becoming a Christian. Brian began sharing the Gospel of sin and repentance right away along with many other fellow skateboarders.

== Evangelising ==
Soon after this Tracy became a Christian, they were remarried and Brian became to serve as a Deacon at the Sanctuary Church and began preaching on Sunday nights. In 2005, along with fellow skateboarders, Christian Hosoi, Jay Haizlip, they started the Uprising, a skateboard ministry that reaches out to youth and the skating community through assemblies and large arena festivals. In 2008 the Uprising was documented by Steelroots, a Christian youth television network, and made into a reality television show. The first season of The Uprising, had eight episodes following the ministry around California and Britain. Season 2, began airing in the autumn of 2009 and filmed an additional 10 episodes, estimated to have reached into 100 million homes and won awards in the United Kingdom.

In 2009 Brian started the skate ministry SkateBible. That year, he wrote, co-produced with Howie Lang, edited, skated and starred in "Foolishness" a 60-minute Gospel presentation by SkateBible and SumHow productions. This film went around the world by way of television, word of mouth and DVD. In 2013 it won many awards along with best Evangelistic film of the year. John Piper commented "Brian Sumner's skate-studded DVD, "Foolishness," is the fullest 60-minute Gospel word I've heard."

Brian also partnered with I AM SECOND ministries IAMSECOND.com and filmed his testimony that along with celebrities, athletes and more, plays on the internet worldwide.. In 2011 Brian helped produce, skate in, co-ordinate stunts and act in as himself the Skip stone Pictures film Hardflip. Also starring in this film is skateboard legend Christian Hosoi, John Schneider, Rosanna Arquette, Randy Wayne and Sean Michael Afable.

Brian's deep faith, led him to various Bible schools and courses, one of which was Michael Chan's, Eternity Bible College. In 2011 he spoke at Liberty University, the biggest Christian university in the world. Today Brian is a Pastor at Rock Harbor Church in Huntington Beach, where he preaches/teaches and focuses on city evangelism and outreach. He continues to travel the world partnering with ministries and churches to spread the Gospel.

In 2015 Brian put out his first book "Never Fails", a "30-Day Devotional" for married couples, courting, and singles.

== Family life ==
Brian was married at 19 to Tracy Sumner of Huntington Beach, California. Their son Dakota was born soon after. They divorced within two years but then remarried and gave birth to their second child, Eden. In 2010 Tracy gave birth to their third child Jude. Today Brian and his wife Tracy are part of the Rock Harbor Community, where they finished marriage counseling through Rock Harbor under Dr Tirabassi, so they can continue to help couples in their struggles and challenges.
