= Cape Fear Community College =

College in Wilmington, North Carolina, U.S.

Coordinates: 34.2257255°N 77.9447102°W

- Type: Public community college
- Established: 1958
- Parent institution: North Carolina Community College System
- President: Jim Morton
- Faculty: 280 full-time faculty
- Students: 14,170 (Fall 2022)
- Location: Wilmington, North Carolina, United States
- Campus: Urban
- Colors: Blue and white
- Nickname: Sea Devils
- Mascot: Ray the Sea Devil
- Website: cfcc.edu

Cape Fear Community College (CFCC) is a public community college in Wilmington, North Carolina. It enrolls nearly 23,000 students each year. The service area of Cape Fear Community College includes New Hanover and Pender counties with a main campus located in downtown Wilmington and satellite campuses in Castle Hayne, Burgaw, and Surf City.

== History ==
Founded in 1958 as one of the Industrial Education Centers around the state, The Wilmington Industrial Education Center (WEIC) offered courses for high school students during the day and classes for adults at night. The 32,000-square-foot facility included shops areas, classrooms, chemistry labs, physics labs, a library, and a small administrative office.

In May of 1963, the North Carolina General Assembly enacted into law North Carolina General Statute 115A, which established a Department of Community Colleges under the State Board of Education and for the administration of institutions in the Community College System. This legislation transformed WEIC into Cape Fear Technical Institute (CFTI). With the strong support of local industry, as well as the Chamber of Commerce of 100 and the Merchants Association, a $575,000 bond issue was proposed to match federal funds for building new facilities to be used exclusively by CFTI. The new facilities provided CFTI with the ability to expand offerings to include new programs of study and enroll more students in high-demand programs.

To more clearly reflect its expanded role and mission, the Board of Trustees later recommended that the school change its name. On January 1, 1988, the New Hanover County Board of Commissioners concurred with the board of trustees and officially became Cape Fear Community College (CFCC). It opened a new campus in northern New Hanover County in 2002.

=== Scandals ===
In recent years, in spite of accolades recognizing exceptional faculty, staff, and degree programs, the college has dealt with multiple scandals associated with the Board of Trustees, past college president Ted Spring, and current president Jim Morton. In recent years, nearly all of the scandals are associated with Jim Morton, including the issues surrounding his lack of credentials and allegations that he has created a toxic work environment.

Ted Spring was hired in July, 2014. He was asked by the board of trustees to resign in 2015 after coming under fire for misuse of public funds. He reportedly attempted to get free housing, free airline upgrades, to get public funds to pay for his wife's travel, engaged in nepotism, and blackmailed subordinates, in spite of making a salary of $268,356 a year.

Although there was evidence uncovered by the NC State Auditor of Spring engaging in inappropriate behavior, he was successful in a lawsuit against the CFCC Board of Trustees due to their process in asking him to resign, which Spring successfully argued violated his "due process rights".

Shortly after Spring's resignation, the Board of Trustees hired interim president Amanda Lee, PhD, as college president. She was forced to resign shortly afterwards. Following her resignation, and without an exhaustive search, the Board of Trustees installed interim president Jim Morton as college president. Jim Morton was given the top job in spite of the fact that he had no higher-education experience prior to his hiring to CFCC in 2015. The Board voted in 2018 not to conduct a search for a new college president, with all members of the Board of Trustees voting for Mr. Morton with the exception of Jonathan Barfield, William Turner, and John Melia.

In spite of his lack of higher-education experience, and the fact that he is the only community college president in North Carolina who only holds a bachelor's degree, Morton was given a raise over his predecessor and was given control of the college. Immediately after his appointment in 2018, and in the years since, Morton's installment has been contested by faculty, staff, and members of the community.

After Mr. Morton took control of the college, he has been criticized for ignoring transfer programs in favor of vocational programs, creating a toxic work environment, engaging in retaliation against employees, having an inappropriate relationship with his executive assistant, paying his executive assistant significantly more than average, hiring friends and loyalists, and engaging in gross mismanagement.

Morton was quoted by a high-level employee as saying that "Faculty are like line workers in a factory. When one drops dead, you just easily replace them with another.". Under Morton's leadership, there has been exceptionally high turnover for experienced faculty and staff. In his response to WECT, President Morton claimed that he had "positive relationships with staff and faculty". However, two days after the WECT expose about Mr. Morton's mismanagement aired on January 13, reporter Ann McAdams announced on the 6:00 p.m. news that she had been contacted by no less than 26 current and former employees of CFCC, all of whom corroborated events listed in her first report.

In early 2020, the issues at CFCC relating to President Jim Morton were covered by national news outlets. National Review Reporter, George Leef, argued that Morton's administration of CFCC was an example of an“abuse of power”, and that “...[T]he root of the problem seems to be that the Board of Trustees, rather than exerting independent oversight of the president, is in league with him."

Investigative Reporter Ann McAdams uncovered a dramatic increase in the fees paid by CFCC to their law firm. When requested by WECT, they repeatedly refused to explain the increase, provide requested itemized bills, or explain why they have started paying their law firm nearly 10 times more than they did before local reporters began investigating multiple allegations against Jim Morton and the board of trustees. This lack of transparency has led to speculation that Morton may be using state funds for public relations purposes, which has been found to be an inappropriate use of funds in past court decisions.

In response to the scandals, then President of the North Carolina Community Colleges System, Peter Hans, released a statement about CFCC stating the following: "I have advised the college to undertake a climate survey of faculty and staff confidentially administered by an independent third-party." In spite of additional concerns, CFCC administration has confirmed that they will not be following the state requests, and will not complete the faculty climate survey recommended by the state in order to identify problems relating to the toxic work environment.

== Accreditation ==
In 1969 the college was granted status as a Special Purpose Institute by the Southern Association of Colleges and Schools Commission on Colleges (SACSCOC). The following year the Commission on Colleges granted membership to the college contingent upon the successful completion of a self-study within the next five years. This was accomplished, and at the Association's meeting in 1975, the college was granted membership status. In December of 1986, 1996, and 2007, the SACSCOC reaffirmed its accreditation of CFCC.

SACSCOC has issued an warning in December 2023 citing significant non-compliance with the core requirements of accreditation.

== Academics ==
Cape Fear Community College has over 240 programs of study, offering every student an opportunity to seek a credential, degree, certificate, or short-term job training to find a pathway to a career.

== Athletics ==
The Cape Fear Community College athletics teams for both men and women are known as the Sea Devils. The school is a member of the Carolinas Junior College Conference for athletics under the aegis of the National Junior College Athletic Association. The college offers men and women's basketball, men and women's soccer, and women's volleyball. CFCC also has a cheerleading team and offers a variety of intramural activities.

The Joe and Barbara Schwartz Center is where all men's and women's basketball and women's volleyball games are played.

== Notable alumni ==
- Reggie Barnes, former pro-skateboarder and founder/CEO of Eastern Skateboard Supply
- Patrick "ACHES" Price, professional Call of Duty player

One Tree Hill (TV series) The main exterior of Tree Hill High.
