= Kaiya Jota =

English footballer (born 2006)

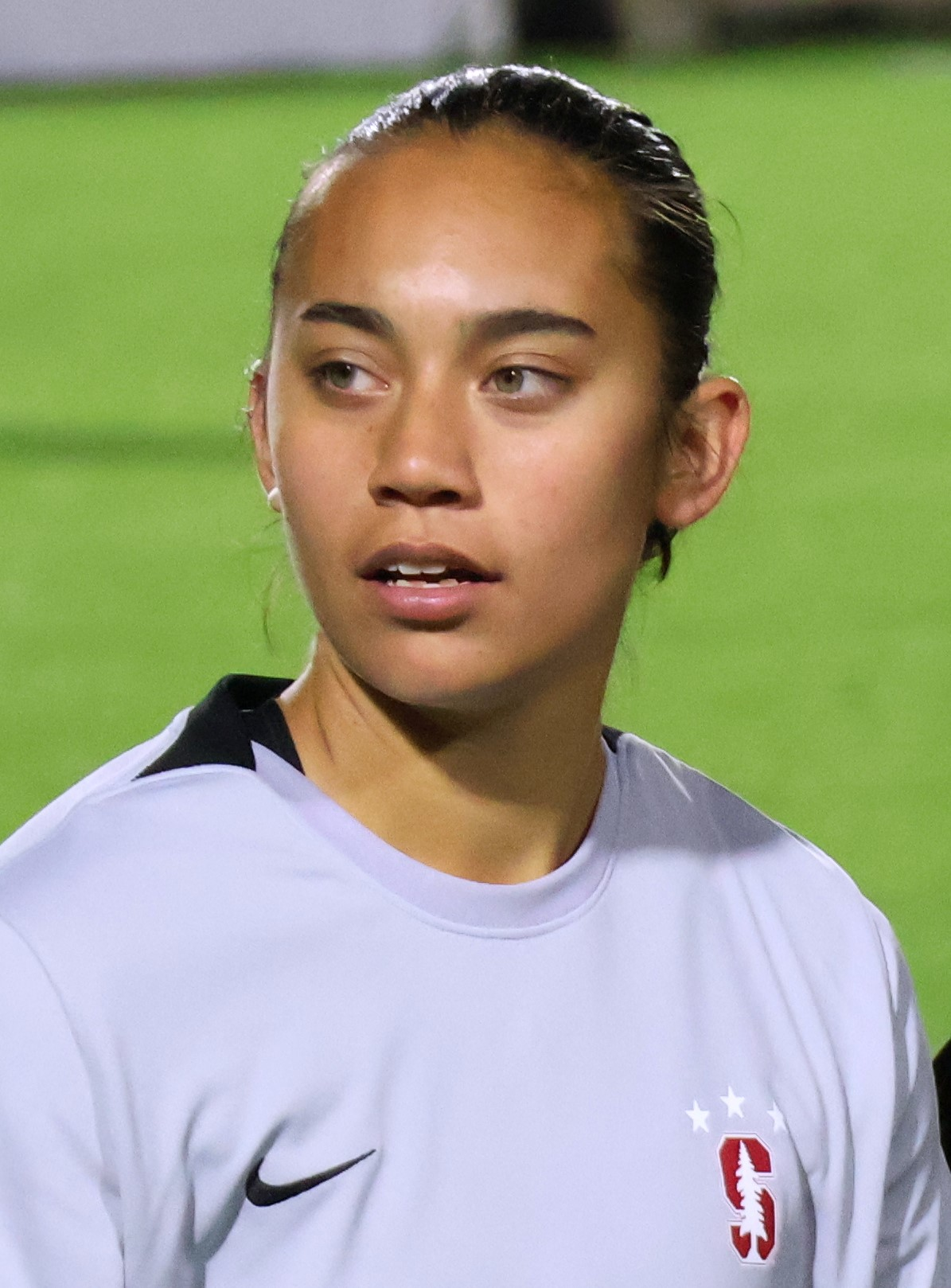
- Jota with Stanford in 2025

Personal information
- Full name: Kaiya Rose Flintham Jota
- Date of birth: February 5, 2006 (age 20)
- Place of birth: Baldwin Park, California, U.S.
- Height: 1.78 m (5 ft 10 in)
- Position: Goalkeeper

Team information
- Current team: Stanford Cardinal
- Number: 22

Youth career
- Marshall Fundamental Secondary School
- Whitfield SC Hawaii
- Los Angeles Breakers

College career
Years	Team	Apps	(Gls)
2024–	Stanford Cardinal	9	(0)

International career^{‡}
2023	Philippines U20	2	(0)
2022	Philippines	1	(0)
2025	England U19	1	(0)
2025–	England U20		
Modeling information
Hair color	Brown
Eye color	Hazel
Agency	Storm Management LA
- ‡ National team caps and goals as of 21:10; February 18 2026 (UTC)

Kaiya Rose Flintham Jota (born February 5, 2006) is a college soccer player who plays as a goalkeeper for the Stanford Cardinal. Born in the United States, she represents England on the youth international stage, currently playing for the England under-20 national team. Jota previously played for the Philippines—at both under-20 and senior level—and was included in their squad at the 2023 FIFA Women's World Cup.

== Early career ==
Jota attended Marshall Fundamental Secondary School, where she played soccer. She was named to the Mission Valley League First Team for three consecutive years, and in 2022 she was named to the CIF All-League

In 2023, Jota committed to play college soccer for the Stanford Cardinal.

== College career ==
After spending her freshman season with the Stanford Cardinal as unused backup to Haley Craig in 2024, Jota saw playing time as a substitute for freshman starter Caroline Birkel during her sophomore season in 2025.

== International career ==
Born in the United States to a Filipino father and an English mother, Jota is eligible to play for England, Philippines, or the United States at international level.

=== Philippines youth team ===
Jota played for Philippines in two fixtures in the U20 Asian Cup qualifiers in March 2023, losing 6–0 to China and getting sent off against Laos.

=== Philippines senior team ===
Jota was first invited to train for the Philippines during their September 2022 training camp in California. Due to her inability to obtain her Philippine passport in time for the friendly match against New Zealand, she was unable to make the matchday list.

In October 2022, Jota received her first official call-up for the Philippines in their training camp and friendlies against Costa Rica. A couple of months later, Jota was once again called up for the Philippines for their friendlies against Papua New Guinea. She made her debut for the Philippines in a 9–0 win against Papua New Guinea, coming in as a substitute, replacing Olivia McDaniel in the second half.

Jota was included in the team's lineup for the 2023 FIFA Women's World Cup. She did not feature in any games but trained with the team in New Zealand.

=== England youth teams ===
On October 16, 2024, Jota was called up to the England under-19 team for Algarve Cup matches against Netherlands and Norway. She was subsequently called up to the under-20 squad in November 2025 and February 2026, for international matches and training camps in Spain. In August 2026, Jota was called up to represent England at the 2026 U-20 World Cup.

== Personal life ==
Jota's sister, Asia, is also a soccer player who plays as a midfielder for Bethany Lutheran College in NCAA Division III.

At Stanford, Jota is a major in broadcasting and communications. England under-20 teammate Eleanor Klinger also attends the college; the pair are in the same graduating class.

Jota is also a model.

== Honors ==
Stanford Cardinal

- Atlantic Coast Conference: 2025
- ACC tournament: 2025
