= Shoe Goo =

Synthetic rubber adhesive and sealant used for athletic shoe repair

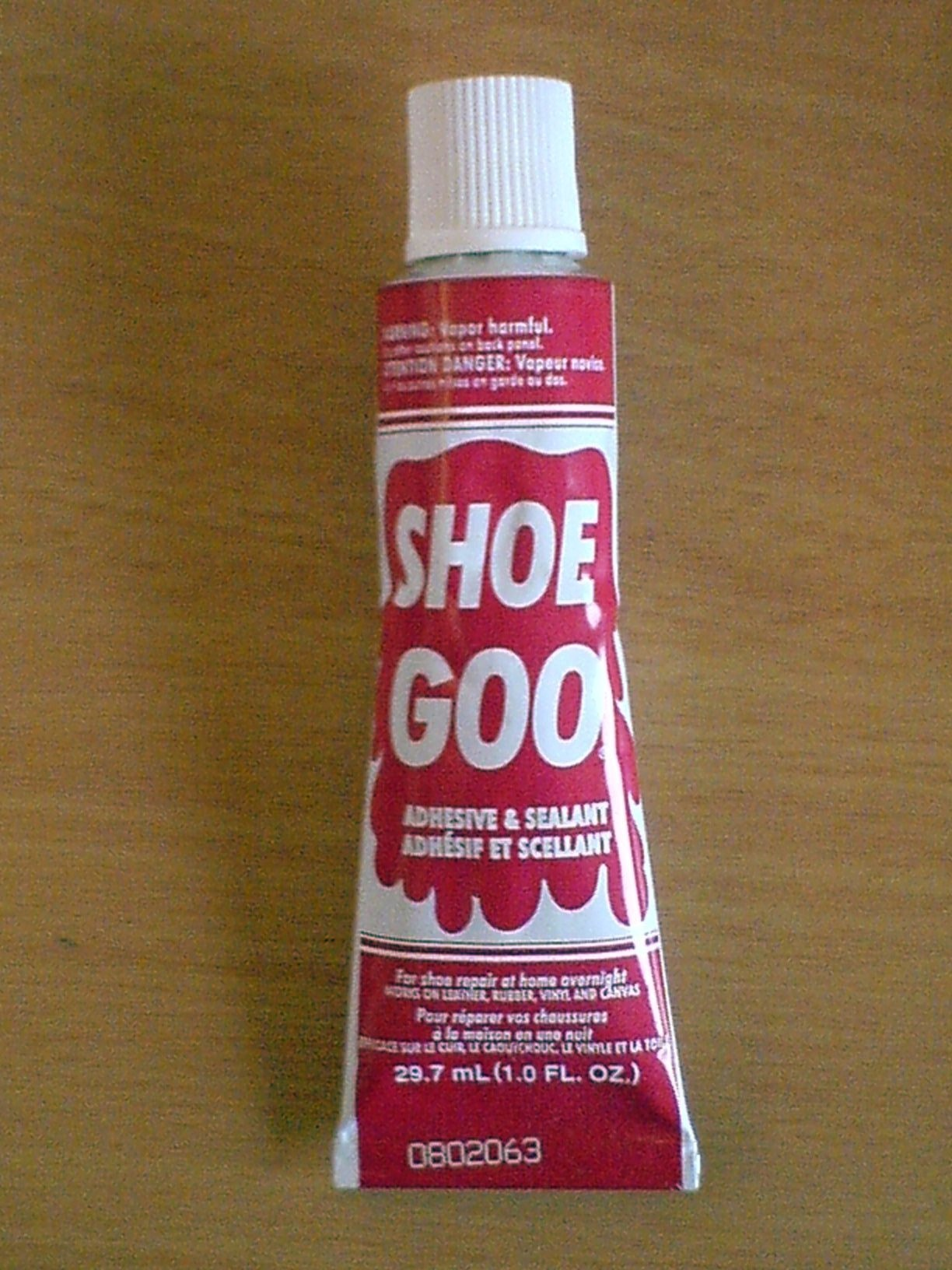
A tube of Shoe Goo

Shoe Goo is a brand of adhesive and sealant intended for repairs of footwear. Shoe Goo is a specialized type of rubber cement that contains a cleaning/degreasing solvent and an abrasion-resistant synthetic rubber. It is a registered trademark of Eclectic Products, based in Eugene, Oregon.

== Origins ==
Shoe Goo was created in part in 1972 by Lyman Van Vliet, a 45-year-old senior executive at Hughes Aircraft Co. As a frequent tennis player, Van Vliet was dissatisfied with the durability of the soles of his tennis shoes and sought a method to extend their life by repairing them.

Although he already held several patents related to the aerospace industry, he had no extensive background in chemistry. Nevertheless, he worked to create an adhesive with a pliable surface coating for shoe soles, whipping up his experimental blends in a spaghetti pot. The result of his efforts was a polymer eventually marketed as "Shoe Goo".

In 1972, to market his creation, Van Vliet started a business called Eclectic Products, with its manufacturing facilities in his home garage in Palos Verdes, California. He placed small ads in tennis magazines, and his wife Sandy approached tennis pro shops. Despite their efforts, they obtained only 22 retail orders during their first year.

In 1974, Sandy convinced the retail giant K-Mart to carry Shoe Goo. Although originally developed for tennis shoes, Shoe Goo quickly gained a foothold in the booming jogging market of the 1970s and 1980s.

By the end of its first decade, the company employed 15 people and had annual sales of approximately $2 million. Lyman Van Vliet quit his job at Hughes Aircraft to work full-time on his enterprise.

In 1976 Eclectic Products established a manufacturing facility in nearby San Pedro. In 1988, Eclectic Products was sold to the Willamette Valley Company, which moved Shoe Goo's operations to Eugene, Oregon.

== Uses ==
Although Shoe Goo can be used on rubber, wood, glass, concrete and metal, it is most commonly used as a pliable adhesive for separated shoe components, as a filler on worn shoe soles, and as a sealer to repair waterproof fabrics and footwear.

Skateboarders use Shoe Goo on their skate shoes to protect them from, and repair damage done by, the skateboard's sandpaper-like "grip tape". Cyclists use it to repair punctures by bonding vulcanised rubber patches to the punctured rubber inner tube. It is used by hobbyists in lieu of rubber cement as an assembly adhesive for radio controlled models of cars and aircraft, repair of Lexan bodies, and as a waterproofing agent for model boats. It is also used to protect the toes of cricket bats.

== Composition ==
Shoe Goo is composed of:

- Styrene-butadiene, a synthetic rubber with good abrasion resistance
- Toluene or tetrachloroethylene solvent
- Solvent naphtha, a cleaning/degreasing solvent
