= Freestyle skateboarding =

Sport discipline

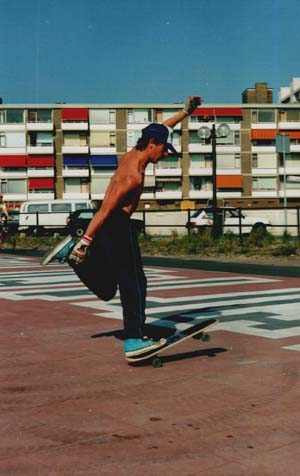
A freestyle skateboard performing a "tailwheelie grab"

Freestyle skateboarding (or freestyle) is one of the oldest styles of skateboarding and was intermittently popular from the 1960s until the early 2000s, when the final large-scale professional freestyle skateboarding competition was held.

== Description ==
The emphasis in freestyle is technical flat ground skateboarding. Often a freestyler will need little more than a board and a smooth, flat surface. Music and choreography have always been an essential part of the professional freestyle routine.

== History ==
=== 1950s and 1960s ===
Freestyle in the 1950s was created by members of the surfing culture who sought an alternative during times when conditions were not conducive to surfing—surfers would imitate their water-based maneuvers on skateboards when ocean conditions were poor. In the 1960s, many freestyle tricks were derived from gymnastics and dancing.

=== 1970s and 1980s ===
The following two decades were defined by a progression towards technical, fluid, and more creative routines. Influential freestyle skateboarders of the 1970s and 1980s included Russ Howell, Rodney Mullen, Joe Humeres and Per Welinder. Freestyle in the 80s was further influenced by female skaters, led by Diane Veerman and Leslie Miller, both of whom competed alongside men in freestyle contests, such as the 1983 NSA Paramount contest In Los Angeles, where Veerman placed 13th out of 31 competitors. Freestyle skating changed significantly in the 1980s, when ollies and ollie-based flip tricks were invented and introduced to the discipline, with Mullen playing a significant role in this process.

== Organizations ==
California Amateur Skateboard League (C.A.S.L.) was founded in 1982 by Frank Hawk with the help of two other "skater parents", Sonja Catalano and Jeanne Hoffmann. C.A.S.L. is where most of the top professional skateboarders from around the world started competing and is still run today. In 1995, professional freestyle skateboarder Stefan "Lillis" Åkesson started the International Network for Flatland Freestyle Skateboarding (INFFS) and, with Daniel Gesmer, produced Flatline and the online version Flatline Online. Following the inception of these initiatives, freestyle skateboarders connected and interacted on a global scale in a manner that had not been experienced previously. The World Freestyle Skateboard Association (WFSA) was then founded by Bob Staton, Åkesson, and Gesmer in the year 2000, thereby attracting further interest in freestyle skateboarding.

== See also ==
- Freestyle skateboarding tricks
- Category:Freestyle skateboarders
