= Jeremy Klein =

American skateboarder

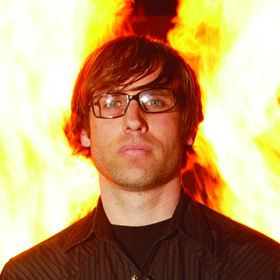

Personal information
- Nickname: Playboy
- Born: July 12, 1971 (age 54) Torrance, California, U.S.

Sport
- Country: United States
- Sport: Skateboarding

Jeremy Klein (born July 12, 1971) is an American artist and former professional skateboarder.

== Professional skateboarding ==
Klein rose to prominence as one of the original riders for the skateboard brand World Industries. He then switched to Birdhouse Skateboards, founded and owned by Tony Hawk. After being one of the first professionals on Birdhouse, Klein retired from the company in 2008.

== Hook-Ups Skateboards ==
Hook-Ups is an American skateboard brand created by Klein in 1993 that is known for using Japanese animation style female characters and monsters on their products. The brand was part of the Blitz Distribution family who also distributed brands such as L.E Skateboards, Black Label, and SK8Mafia at that time.

Hook-Ups began as a T-shirt brand but grew to include skateboards, shoes, and accessories; as of 2025, the brand produces skateboards, T-shirts, a baseball-style cap, and stickers.

== Other media ==
Klein has appeared as himself in several episodes of Tom Green Live!

He appeared as himself in the 2007 documentary The Man Who Souled the World, a documentary about the career of World Industries founder Steve Rocco.

== Videography ==
- World Industries: Rubbish Heap (1989)
- Tracker Trucks: Stacked (1991)
- Birdhouse Projects: Feasters (1992)
- Birdhouse Projects: Ravers (1993)
- Birdhouse Projects: Untitled (1994)
- Hook-Ups: Asian Goddess (1994)
- Birdhouse: The End (1998)
- Hook-Ups: Destroying America (2001)
- Birdhouse: The Beginning (2007)
