= Willy Santos =

Filipino American professional skateboarder

Personal information
- Born: c. 1975 Subic Bay, Philippines
- Occupations: Skateboarder; entrepreneur
- Years active: 1985–present
- Website: willysworkshop.com

Sport
- Country: United States
- Sport: Skateboarding
- Event: Street skateboarding
- Team: Birdhouse Skateboards
- Turned pro: 1990

Achievements and titles
- World finals: Munster World Cup Street Contest, 1997
- National finals: X-Games Street Contest, 1997

Willy Monolato Santos (born c. 1975) is a Filipino-American professional skateboarder and entrepreneur, specializing in street skateboarding. He was one of the original skaters with Tony Hawk's Birdhouse Skateboards team. In 1992, he was the TransWorld Skateboarding skater of the year. He won the Munster World Cup Street Contest in Germany in 1997. Thrasher Magazine calls him "one of the best street skaters during the dark early 90s."

== Early life ==
Willy Monolato Santos was born in a military base in Subic Bay, Philippines around 1975. His father is a United States Navy engineer from Manila and his mother is Kapampangan.

When his father was transferred by the Navy, his family moved to Corpus Christi, Texas when he was one year old and to San Diego, California when he was two. The family moved back to Subic Bay when he was in the second grade. They returned to San Diego when Santos was in fifth grade.

Santos took up skateboarding after seeing youths in his area who were also into the sport. He started participating in amateur contests in San Diego when he was thirteen years old.

== Career ==
Santos was one of the first Filipino professional skaters. He turned professional when he was fifteen years old, and was first sponsored by G&S Skateboards. G&S released a Santos skateboard.

When he was in the eleventh grade, he was heavily recruited and was asked to join skateboarding teams by Tony Hawk, Plan B Skateboards, Rodney Mullen, Steve Rocco and Mike Ternasky of World Industries. He joined Tony Hawk as one of the original riders for Birdhouse Skateboards in 1992 and was given a used Honda Accord as part of his sponsorship deal. Santos suggested then-amateurs Andrew Reynolds and Matt Beach for the Birdhouse team. Later, he discovered Jim Greco and recruited him to the team.

Santos is regarded by Thrasher Magazine as "one of the best street skaters during the dark early 90s." In 1992, he was the TransWorld Skateboarding skater of the year. In June 1997, he was ranked fifth in the world. He placed third in the first X Games Street Contest in Rhode Island in 1997, competing against Tony Hawk. He then won the Munster World Cup Street Contest in Germany in 1997. In 1998, he won the New Jersey Vans Triple Crown Street Contest. He also won the Gravity Games Best Trick Street in 2000.

Santos appeared in several skate videos for the team such as Feasters (1992) and The End (1998). He was known for his "nollie nosegrind down handrails". He used a dog graphic on his skateboards in the 1990s and early 2000s. He also was sponsored by Vans and had a signature shoe in 1997.

After almost 25 years, he left Birdhouse to form his own skateboard company, Willys Workshop in Rancho Peñasquitos, San Diego, California. where he now coaches skaters for his brand. He uses Filipino imagery on his products. In 2012, HBO featured Santos in its East of Main Street series.

== Media appearances ==
Santos appears as one of the playable pro skaters in Grind Session for the PlayStation.

== Personal life ==
Santos lives in Mira Mesa, San Diego, California. He has two children with his wife Shelly.

== Filmography ==
=== Films and videos ===
Year	Title	Role	Notes	References
1992	Feasters	Himself		
1993	Ravers	Himself		
1994	The Skateboard Kid 2	Mike Roads		
1996	Europe 1996	Himself		
1996	Balance In The World of Chaos	Himself		
1998	The End	Himself		
2000	Tampa 2000	Himself		
2001	Destroying America	Himself		
2007	The Beginning	Himself		
2007	Transworld Skateboarding Presents Trick Tips with Willy Santos: Instructional Video Number Two	Himself		
2009	It's Always Sunnies In Australia	Himself		
2010	East Coast Tour	Himself		
2011	Tour Du Monde	Himself		
2020	SK8MAFIA 2020	Himself		

=== Video games ===
Year	Title	Role	Notes	References
2000	Grind Session	Himself	Playable skater	

== See also ==
- List of Filipino American sportspeople
