= Del Mar Skate Ranch =

American skatepark (1978–1987)

Coordinates: 32°58′35″N 117°15′10″W

- Interactive map of Del Mar Skate Ranch
- Location: San Diego, California USA
- Type: concrete skatepark

Construction
- Opened: August 1978
- Demolished: July 1987
- Architect: Tom Inouye, Chris Strople, and Curtis Hesselgrave
- Project manager: Chip Morton ("Park Manager")

Website
- http://www.delmarskateranch.com/

The Del Mar Skate Ranch, also known as the DMSR, was an American skatepark in Del Mar, California, which opened August 1978 and was demolished July 1987.

== History ==
DMSR was designed by IPS (Inouye's Pool Service) staffers Tom Inouye, Chris Strople and Curtis Hesselgrave; however, the actual construction of the skatepark was farmed out to the lowest bidding contractor.

The park was built in 1978 and was the gathering point for many influential skaters. Del Mar featured a handful of different obstacles including the "Keyhole pool" where many tricks were done for the first time.

Del Mar Skate Ranch was skated by many skateboarding innovators including Tony Hawk, Steve Steadham, Tod Swank, Dave Swift, Neil Blender, Christian Hosoi, Bill Danforth, Mike Mcgill, Lester Kasai, Rodney Mullen, Danny Way, and many others.

The park was demolished in 1987 because the landowner sold a nearby part of the area for a hotel. The owner of this new hotel did not consider it desirable to have a skateboard park in the vicinity.
