= Skateboarding Hall of Fame =

Skateboarding museum

- Established: 1997
- Location: 1555 Simi Town Center Way - Unit 230 Simi Valley, California, U.S. 93065 - (formerly at 4266 Valley Fair Street, Simi Valley CA 93063)
- Website: skateboardinghalloffame.org

The Skateboarding Hall of Fame (SHoF), founded in 1997, is a museum and hall of fame located in Simi Valley, California, United States. The museum documents the history of skateboarding and the skateboarders, photographers, and other notable figures, publications, and companies who have influenced its development.

The museum holds the largest collection of skateboard paraphernalia in the world, and contributes to skateboarding's history through its annual induction of influential skaters and cultural icons into the Skateboarding Hall of Fame.

== Current location ==
Formerly located at the Skatelab skate park (also in Simi Valley), the Skateboarding Hall of Fame reopened in December 2018 at a 10,000 square foot retail space located in the Simi Valley Town Center. Its collection now includes thousands of vintage boards, memorabilia, artifacts, a library, VHS, painting art, skating ramps, and a skate shop. In an interview given to the Ventura County Star, founder and CEO Todd Huber commented, “This space is such a positive thing, not only for Simi Valley, but for skateboarders too. They really deserve a spot like this that’s honoring skateboarding.”

In 2009, the museum began inducting individuals into the Hall of Fame. The first group of inductees included skateboarding pioneers Danny Way, Bruce Logan, Tony Hawk, and Tony Alva. Every year that has followed, with the exception of 2011, the SHoF has elected new inductees.

== List of inductees by year ==
=== 2009 ===
Danny Way, Bruce Logan, Tony Hawk, Tony Alva

=== 2010 ===
Larry Stevenson, C.R. Stecyk III, Stacy Peralta, Patti McGee, Eric Koston, Torger Johnson, Steve Caballero, Bob Burnquist

=== 2011 ===
No inductees

=== 2012 ===
Peggy Oki, Frank Nasworthy, John Humphrey, Mark Gonzales, Glen E. Friedman, Black Flag (band), Danny Bearer, Jay Adams

=== 2013 ===
Brandon "Woody" Woodward, Laura Thornhill, Tom Sims, NHS, Inc., Rodney Mullen, Christian Hosoi, Alan Gelfand, DEVO, Wendy Bearer Bull, Warren Bolster

=== 2014 ===
Fausto Vitello, Pipeline Skatepark, Ellen O’Neal, Steve Olson, Jim Muir, Lance Mountain, Natas Kaupas, Laurie Turner Demott, Gregg Carroll, J. Grant Brittain

=== 2015 ===
Steve Van Doren, Tracker Trucks, Elissa Steamer, Duane Peters, James O'Mahoney, Chris Miller, Robin Logan, Brian Logan, Henry Hester, John Cardiel, Cara-Beth Burnside, Neil Blender

=== 2016 ===
Cindy Whitehead, Ed Templeton, Suicidal Tendencies, Powell Peralta, Ty Page, Jen O'Brien, Mofo, Tommy Guerrero, Skip Frye, Eddie Elguera, Ellen Berryman, Steve Alba

=== 2017 ===
Gregg Weaver, Vicki Vickers, Thrasher (magazine), Daewon Song, Jim Phillips, Bob Mohr, Mike McGill, Shogo Kubo, Russ Howell, Eric Dressen, Kim Cespedes, Sonja Catalano

=== 2018 ===
Mike Weed, Skateboarder (magazine), Tommy Ryan, Judi Oyama, Guy Mariano, Allen Losi, Pattie Hoffman, Jeff Ho, Matt Hensley, David "Hackman" Hackett, Brad Bowman, Bahne

=== 2019 ===
Gale Webb, Desiree Von Essen Harrington, Val Surf, Ray "Bones" Rodriguez, Edie Robertson, Jeff Phillips, Jason Lee, Kona Skatepark, Tom "Wally" Inouye, Cris Dawson, Kevin "The Worm" Anderson, Micke Alba

=== 2020 ===
Jerry Valdez, Chris Strople, Chris Strople, Doug "Pineapple" Saladino, George Orton, Ed Nadalin, Chad Muska, Dennis Martinez, Terry Lawrence, Marty Grimes, John "Tex" Gibson, John Freis, Deanna Calkins, Rick Blackhart, Bob Biniak, Ray Barbee, Don "Waldo" Autry, Hobie Alter

=== 2021 ===
Colleen Boyd Turner, Tina Trefethen, Kareem Campbell, Mike Vallely, Mike Smith, Eric Grisham, Billy Ruff, Steve Cathey, Lonnie Toft, Kent Senatore, John Hutson, Dave Andrecht, Bobby Valdez, Bobby Piercy, Skitch Hitchcock, Denis Shufeldt, Chris Yandall, Cliff Coleman

=== 2022 ===
Tom Groholski, Tim Marting, Steve Steadham, Salman Agah, Peter Gifford, Pat Duffy, Lester Kasai, Kevin Reed, Jim Fitzpatrick, Darrell Miller, Bert Lamar, Gregg Ayres, Steve Rocco, Shawn Peddie, Larry Gordon (G&S), Jana Payne-Booker, Bruce Walker, Bob Skoldberg, Leilani Kiyabu-Glasheen, Scott Foss, Mike Folmer, Mark Lake, Jay Smith, Monty Nolder

=== 2023 ===
Mike Carroll, Wes Humpston, Rick Howard, Tom Penny, Rip City, Skip Engblom, Anita Tessensohn Sanford, Saecha Clarke, Jesse Martinez, John Lucero, Lonny Hiramoto, Howard Hood, Wentzle Ruml, Paul Constantineau, Ray Flores, Jeff Grosso, Jimmy Plumer

=== 2024 ===
Tom Knox, Ron Allen, Lynn Kramer, Di Dootson Rose, Tony Magnusson, Claus Grabke, Geoff Rowley

=== 2025 ===
Sally Anne Miller, Dale Smith, Titus Dittmann, Mike Ternasky, Jim Gray, George Trafton, Steve Hilton, Dave Hilton, Roy Jamieson, Larry Bertlemann, Darren Ho, Pat Ngoho, Freddie De Sota, Ben Schroeder, Karma Tsocheff, Wade Speyer, Sean Sheffey, Sal Barbier, Bucky Lasek, Jaime Reyes

=== 2026 ===
Transworld Skateboarding, Jerry Madrid, Tim Payne, Bryce Kanights, Alexis Sablone, Vanessa Torres, Shreddi Repas, Jeff Tatum, Cesar “Cesinha” Chaves, Craig Johnson, Bill Danforth, Lee Ralph, Frankie Hill, Omar Hassan, Julien Stranger, Jeremy Wray, Heath Kirchart, Brian Anderson
