= Jeff Divine (photographer) =

Jeff Divine (born 1950 or 1951) is an American surf photographer. His photographs of the surfing culture over the decades have been widely published and exhibited. He was photo editor for both Surfer and the Surfer's Journal. The Daily Telegraph said Divine is "one of the greats of surf photography".

== Early life ==
Divine was born in 1950 or 1951 and grew up in La Jolla, California. His father, George, was an architect. Divine got his first surfboard in 1964, and is a goofy foot surfer (right foot in front). As a teenager, he worked part-time in a bookstore to save money for a camera.

== Career ==
When Divine got his first camera, he began taking pictures of fellow surfers. He sold his first photograph in 1968. He moved to Oahu in 1971 and joined Surfer magazine as a professional photographer. After moving to Dana Point, California, Divine was the photo editor for Surfer from 1981 to 1998 and wrote feature articles and columns for the magazine. He then went to work for the Surfer's Journal.

His photographs have been exhibited in Los Angeles, New York, and London. In 2007, his work was exhibited at the Oceanside Museum of Art. The SFO Museum featured his photographs in 2017.

== Books ==
His 2000 book, Masters of Surf Photography: Jeff Divine, was published by the Surfer's Journal. Divine's photographs have been included in multiple books, including The History of Surfing (1983), Surfing: The Ultimate Pleasure (1984), The Next Wave (1991), Girl in the Curl (2000), and The Perfect Day (2001).

His photographs were featured in Legends of Surfing: The Greatest Surfriders from Duke Kahanamoku to Kelly Slater, with text by Duke Boyd, and published in 2009.

Surfing Photographs from the Eighties, was published in 2011, was reviewed in the Wall Street Journal, and has since become a collector's item.

In 2020, Divine published Jeff Divine: 70's Surf Photographs, a collection of more than 130 color and black-and-white photographs of surfers in California and Hawaii during the 1970s, with a foreword by William Finnegan.

In 2026, he published Divine Surf: Five Decades of Surfing Action and Culture, with a forward by Matt Warshaw.

== Recognition ==
In 2019, Divine was inducted into the Surfing Walk of Fame at Huntington Beach, California in the category of Surf Culture. He was inducted into the San Diego Surfing Hall of Fame in 2023. The San Diego Surfing Hall of Fame describes Divine as "one of the most influential and iconic surf photographers of all time".

== Personal life ==
Divine and his wife Julie have one son.
