= Ty Page =

American skateboarder (1958–2017)

Personal information
- Nickname: Mr. Incredible
- Born: May 30, 1958 California
- Died: June 1, 2017 (aged 59)

Sport
- Sport: Skateboarding

Ty Scott Page (May 30, 1958 – June 1, 2017) was a professional skateboarder. He got his nickname "Mr. Incredible" during the early 1970s, a significant period in skateboarding history. He was inducted into the Skateboarding Hall of Fame in 2016.

== Early life ==
Ty Scott Page was born in 1958 in California and grew up close to the breakwater near Redondo Beach, California.

Page began surfing at the age of three and achieved national recognition in 1972 by winning the national surfing title at the age of 14. He secured second place at the U.S. Surfing Championships at Huntington Beach at 15. During this time, he was a member of the Wave Trek Surf Team, alongside fellow Makaha skateboarder Rusty Henderson, in the early 1970s. Both Page and his brother Greg were active participants in aquatics at Redondo Union High School and worked as lifeguards at the San Clemente beach. Page and Greg were both avid surfers and were said to have surfed well when the breakwater was over eight feet.

Page was given a skateboard at the age of 4 by Greg when he received boards on Christmas. Page later said, "I'm a surfer, and I guess I like skateboarding so much because it's very close to surfing. Surfing is harder than skateboarding, though. Every wave is different, and you have to start out fresh on each wave. With skateboarding, a hard surface is a hard surface. Once you get your balance on solid ground, you can go from there." At first, he skated in basic surf style, attempting anything he and Bruce Logan made up. He began bank riding in 1969, and many of his freestyle maneuvers were original tricks. After the urethane wheel's introduction in 1972, Page saw potential in the sport as a career, so he focused primarily on skateboarding.

== Career ==
Page entered his first skateboarding competition in 1973 at the first Del Mar nationals. However, by 1975, he was a contest veteran and placed second in the junior men's freestyle division. It was at this competition that the Z-Boys debuted on the skating circuit. This competition was referenced in "Lords of Dogtown", which depicted events from the 1970s skateboarding scene in Stacy Peralta's 2001 film about Santa Monica’s "Dogtown and Z-Boys." The movie suggested that Page tried to change his skate style from freestyle to a more surf style, similar to the Z-Boys; however, Page and Bruce Logan had been skating surf style with kick-turns and round-house slides as far back as 1964, before the Z-Boys began skating.

Page took first place at the Santa Barbara Skateboard Championships with long-nose wheelies, headstands, and 360s. He went on to win many national competitions. He said, "One thing I'm into is I don't like to do anything that's easy. In all the tricks that I do, I don't do anything that’s easy. It's just boring; it's not a challenge. I'm just into the challenge of things."

=== The Big Time ===
At 17, Page signed with Bill Riordan, an international sports promoter. Within a few years, he had a substantial income from skateboarding, reportedly around $100,000 annually. In the 1970s, skateboarding was a rapidly growing sport, as evidenced by the 40 million skateboards sold, and a growing industry of protective gear and equipment developed alongside the sport’s popularity. In addition to prize money from competitions, Page had endorsement deals. Page was paid $1 for every Ty Page Professional Skateboard sold, and he was paid for appearances, commercials, movie appearances, and to test new model boards. By the time he was 19 years old, he had an oceanfront apartment and a new Alfa Romeo Spider.

Page starred in several commercials, including Sunny Delight, Wendy's, and MG cars, and appeared in several movies. Page was a U.S. Goodwill Ambassador and traveled around the world performing in exhibitions and safety demonstrations. In 1977, he was awarded the key to the city of New Orleans by the mayor. He performed in Japan multiple times and after two tours through Germany, Page was featured as the centerfold in the November/December 1977 German issue of Skateboard, one of the first U.S. skaters featured in the German Skateboard magazine.

In March 1978, the California Free Former team was featured in Cal Jam 2, skating to Aerosmith, Heart, Ted Nugent, and others. Page skated to the Latin rhythms of "Black Magic Woman" as Carlos Santana performed on stage. The event had an estimated audience of 300,000 people and was aired nationally on ABC. Page's half-pipe skating was highlighted on the cover of Wild World of Skateboarding Magazine in July 1978.

=== "Mr. Incredible" ===
Page is credited with inventing over 50 new moves, including the Ty Slide, Ty Hop (pop-shove it), Half-Hop, Pay Hop, Daffy (also known as a Yeah Right Manual), Head Spinner (also known as a 360 Headstand), Foot Spin, Foot-Spin 360, Toe Spin, Toe-Spin 360, and many backwards footwork maneuvers.

Unity Surfskate in Hermosa Beach made the first skateboard push by sponsoring Page and presented a popular, wooden kick-tail skateboard called the Ty Stix. The second-generation Makaha team of Page, Bruce Logan, Rusty Henderson, Mike Purpus, and Torger Johnson gathered to promote an innovation that impacted skateboarding – the kicktail and double kicktail boards. Mike Purpus said: "The reason the Z-Boys got more recognition was because they were loud and obnoxious, while the Makaha Team just skated great and went on quietly winning contests." Page later signed with California Free Former, the world's largest skateboard manufacturer.

"Mr. Incredible," as he was known, placed first in a number of skateboarding and surfing competitions.

After trying many times to photograph his tricks, SkateBoarder magazine used a high-speed camera to catch him on film for publishing in the August and September 1977 issues. He appeared on the cover of national and international magazines and was frequently featured in skateboarding magazines and journals as well as Newsweek and Sports Illustrated.

=== Hall of Fame and Death ===
Page was an influential figure in the 1970s skateboarding scene. He advocated for many causes including safe traffic behavior. In 1998, he was inducted into the Thrasher Skateboard Hall of Fame. On May 13, 2016, Page was inducted into the IASC Skateboarding Hall of Fame.

In 2015, Page announced that he had brain cancer, an astrocytoma of the frontal lobe. He underwent chemotherapy and radiation, as well as alternative therapies. He died in his home on June 1, 2017, just two days after his 59th birthday. He lived with his wife and three sons in Park City, Utah.
