= Lonnie Toft =

American skateboarder and snowboarder from California

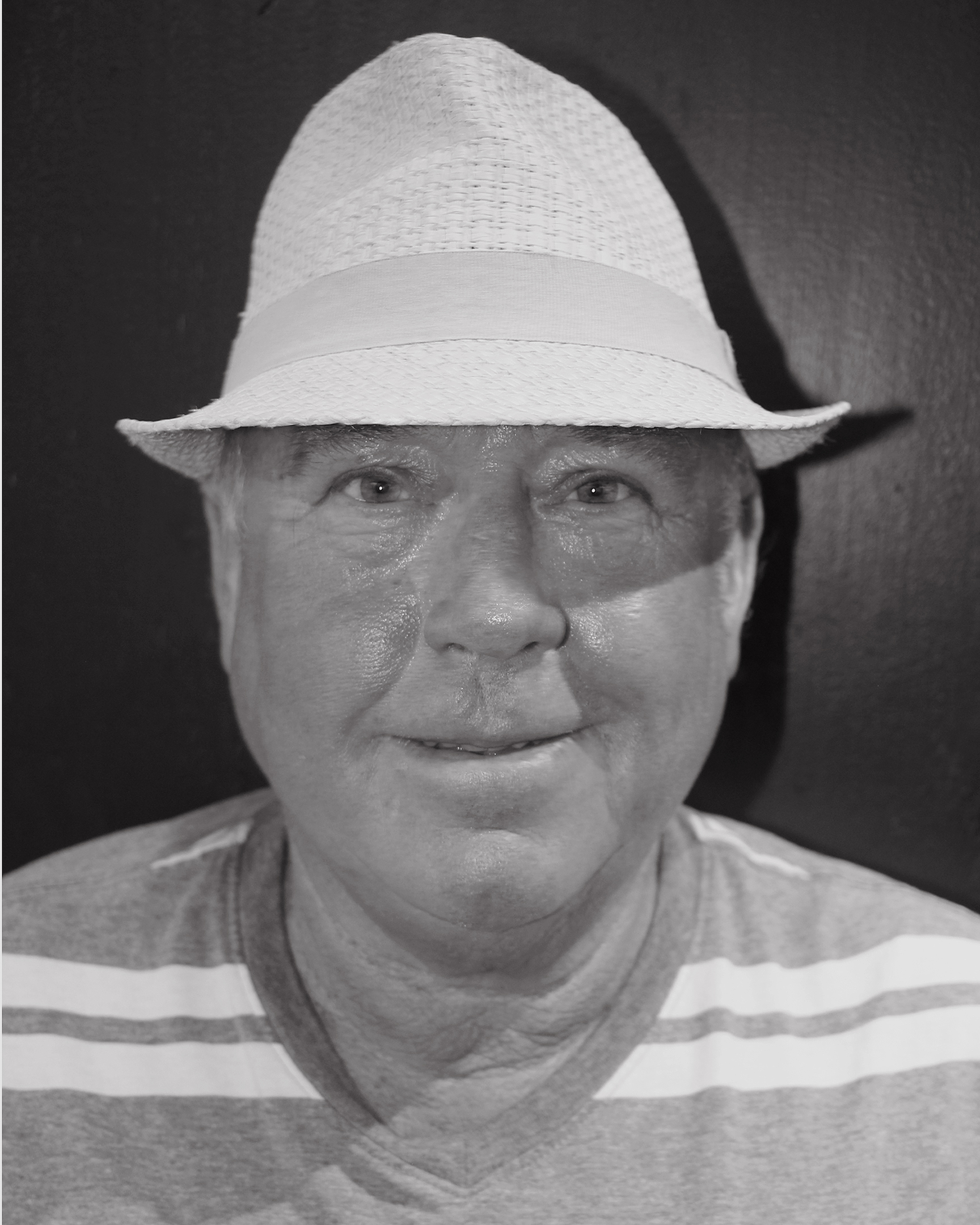
- Toft in Los Angeles (2023)
- Born: May 1958; Oxnard, California, U.S.
- Occupations: Skateboarder, snowboarder, inventor

Lonnie Toft (born May 1958) is a 1970s-era American professional skateboarder and snowboarder from Southern California who has also been extensively involved with surfing, wakeboarding and standup paddleboarding. He was one of the first skateboarders to ride a broader, almost shoe-width boards (20 cm-25 cm wide). He is the inventor of the eight-wheeled skateboard and along with Gordy Lienemann created the G-turn maneuver. He is also the co-creator of the snowboard and was subsequently one of the first professional skateboarders to embrace and promote snowboarding.

Toft was originally sponsored by Pepsi in the early 1970s, performing at skateboarding exhibitions across the United States. Then, in 1976, he became a team rider for the California-based action sports company SIMS who manufactured both skateboards and snowboards. The Sims company's first production snowboard, then called a skiboard was a Lonnie Toft Model skateboard deck attached to a polyethylene molded bottom. In April 1979, Toft appeared on the cover of the magazine Skateboarder.

In 2018 Toft was cited by the online portal Surfer Today as one of the most influential skaters in history and in 2021, Toft was inducted into the Skateboarding Hall of Fame.

In a video filmed for the Skateboarding Hall of Fame's official website, world champion skateboarder Tony Hawk spoke of Toft, "Lonnie Toft was an awesome surfer and skater." In the same video, skateboarding pioneer Lance Mountain says of Toft, "He is remembered for the eight wheeled board the most, but that is really just a reflection of how innovative this guy was. He pushed the limits of skateboarding and what skateboarding is or could be. He was an innovator. We all grew up on Lonnie Toft." And Todd Haber from the Skateboarding Hall of Fame executive committee said, "He brought us the eight-wheeler. He was also an early advocate of the wide boards and snub noses. A guy from that era that always looked rad on a skateboard."

== Early life and career ==
Toft grew up surfing and skateboarding in the Oxnard region northwest of Los Angeles. In a 2012 interview given to the action-sports program The Daily Habit, Toft spoke about growing up in Southern California in the 1970s, "The 70's were irreplaceable. Long hair, skateboarding, surfing, traveling. Skateboarding was evolving and the clay wheels gave way to urethane."

== The eight-wheeled skateboard ==
Lonnie Toft is credited as being the creator and popularizer of the eight-wheeled skateboard. In William Sharp's 2019 skateboarding book Back In The Day, Toft noted that in 1973, his older brother Dan had initially given him the idea. Lonnie immediately bought a pair of clay-wheeled roller skates at a swap meet, took them apart, and fastened them to an extra-wide skateboard deck he had cut from an old door. He said, "I liked to have a variety of boards and the eight-wheeler was just part of my quiver."

== Sims's Lonnie Toft Models ==
In the late 70's, the Sims company released of series of Lonnie Toft signature model skateboards and snowboards including: the 1977 Lonnie Toft Pro Model skateboard deck, the 1978 Lonnie Toft Eight-wheel model and the 1978 Lonnie Toft Skiboard (snowboard).
