= Terry Brown (skateboarder) =

American professional skateboarder (born 1960)

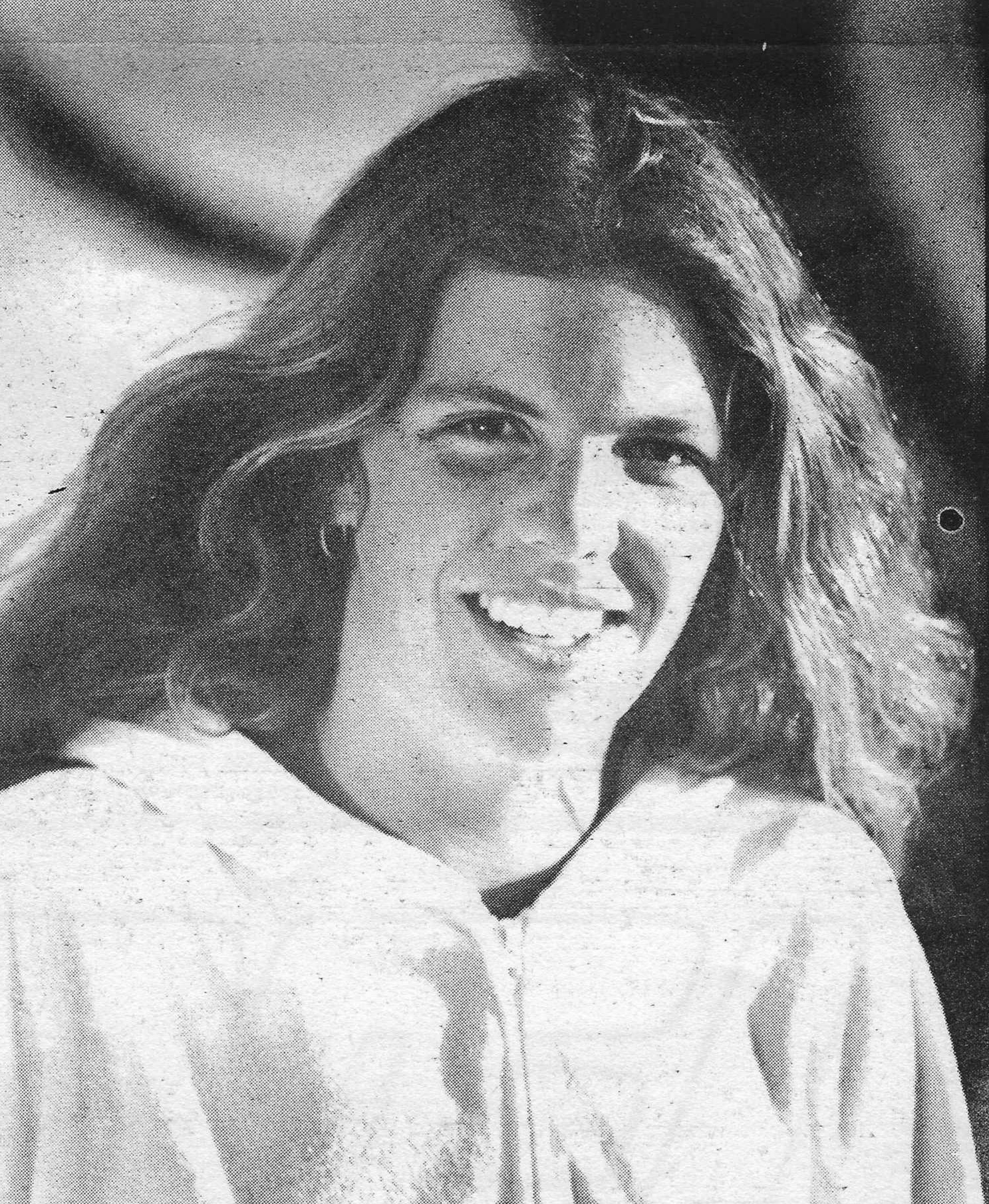
- Brown in 1978

Personal information
- Born: Terry Brown; March 13, 1960 (age 66) Santa Cruz, California, U.S.
- Occupation: Skateboarder
- Years active: 1974–present

Sport
- Country: United States
- Sport: Skateboarding
- Events: Slalom; Downhill
- Turned pro: 1976

Terry Brown (born March 13, 1960) is an American professional skateboarder who excelled in slalom and downhill skateboarding. She held the title of, Women's Slalom World Skateboard Champion in 1977, 1978, and 2002 at the World Slalom Skateboarding Championships in Morro Bay. She was inducted into the Skateboarding Hall of Fame in 2024.

== Early life ==
Brown began skateboarding at 5 years old and was encouraged to skateboard by her brothers. At age 14, professional skater John Hutson noticed her skating skills and encouraged her to take up slalom skateboarding. She skated in various styles but competed mainly in slalom contests.

== Career ==
Brown became a professional skateboarder in 1976, was sponsored by Santa Cruz Skateboards, and was a member of the Santa Cruz Skateboarding team. She became the Women's Tight Course Slalom World Champion at the Women's Slalom World Skateboard Championships in 1977 in Long Beach, California, and in 1978 at the Women's Slalom World Skateboard Championships in Akron, Ohio. After not competing since the 1980s, Brown returned to skating and won the women's division of the Overall World Championship at the World Slalom Skateboarding Championships in Morro Bay. In 2024, she was inducted into the Skateboarding Hall of Fame in Costa Mesa, California.

She was an advocate for female skateboarders, encouraging skateboard publications and advertisers to use more women in their ads and articles, as well as encouraging organizations to add more women's skateboarding categories in the male-dominated competitions of the 1970s.

Brown was endorsed by Santa Cruz Skateboards, Independent Truck Company, and Road Rider Wheels, among others.

== Competition results ==
Year	Competition	Category	Result
1975	Capitola National Skateboarding Competition	Women's Downhill	Won (1st place)
1975	Capitola National Skateboarding Competition	Women's Tricks	Won (1st place)
1976	Cow Palace, San Francisco	Women's Slalom	Won (1st place)
1976	World Skateboard Championships at Long Beach	Women's Slalom	Won (2nd place)
1977	World Skateboard Championships at Long Beach	Women's Tight Course Slalom	Won (1st place)
1977	Catalina Classic on Santa Catalina Island	Women's Dual Slalom	Won (2nd place)
1978	Akron World Championships	Women's Slalom	Won (1st place)
1980	Capitola Classic Professional Downhill Skateboard Competition	Women's Downhill	Won (1st place)
2002	World Slalom Skateboarding Championships in Morro Bay	Women's Division - Overall World Championship	Won (1st place)
