= The Surfer's Journal =

American sports publication

- Editor: Alex Wilson
- Categories: Sports magazine
- Frequency: Bimonthly
- Publisher: Shaun Pezman
- Founder: Steve and Debbee Pezman
- Founded: 1992
- First issue: Spring1992
- Company: Journal Concepts, Inc.
- Country: United States
- Based in: San Clemente, California
- Language: English
- Website: www.surfersjournal.com

The Surfer's Journal is a publication based out of San Clemente, California. Founded in 1992 by Steve and Debbee Pezman, the reader-supported magazine comes out six times a year. It is edited by Alex Wilson and published by Debbee Pezman.

Primarily reader-supported, the magazine focuses on waterman culture—primarily surfing—with emphasis on long-form journalism, high-end photography, and ocean-inspired art.

“People, Culture, Travel, Art” is the tagline of the magazine, but sometimes it's also “Authentic, Adventurous & Downright Weird.”

== History ==
Founder Steve Pezman, a former publisher of Surfer magazine, and Debbee Pezman, former marketing director of Surfer magazine, started the publication for lifelong surfers of all ages. At that point in time, there were dozens of surf magazines internationally.

“Once a surfer learns to ride, what else is there?” asked Pezman in the opening statement of Issue 1, Volume 1. “My answer: a surfer grows into a waterman or woman. A person with a multi-dimensional relationship with the ocean. Surfing, sailing, diving, paddling, fishing, boating, beach-combing, marine sciences, all become tools of a waterman’s ocean relationship. This publication is made for those grown-up surfers.” (The Surfer's Journal, 1.1. 1992)

Former Longboard Magazine editor Scott Hulet took over as editor in 1999, holding the role until 2019, when he transitioned to creativedDirector. (*This is the longest uninterrupted editorship in surf publishing history.)

In 2014, former Surfer magazine editor Brendon Thomas took the role of publisher. In Summer 2017, Brendon Thomas launched The Golfer’s Journal.

In 2022, Alex Wilson took over as editor.

In 2022, Debbee Pezman resumed the role of publisher of The Surfer's Journal.

In 2022, The Surfer's Journal is the only surf periodical in the US. The magazine publishes in three countries and three languages.

Of the magazine, Patagonia founder Yvon Chouinard has been quoted saying, “My house is on fire, my wife runs in and grabs the photo albums, I run in and grab my collections of Surfer’s Journals.”

== International editions ==
The Japanese edition of The Surfer's Journal is published by Outdoor Japan Media.

The French edition of The Surfer's Journal (since 1994) is operated by Gibus de Soultrait and published by Vent de Terre.

== Books ==
In 1998, Journal Concepts, Inc. published its first large-format, photo book, Photo: Grannis: Surfing’s Golden Age 1960-1969, edited by Brad Barrett.

They continued with the Masters of Surf Photography Series, with photo books of Jeff Divine (2000), Art Brewer (2001), Warren Bolster (2002), Tom Servais (2003), Ted Grambeau (2003) and Surf Fever, John Severson Surf Photography (2004). Each volume featured only 500 limited edition copies.

Journal Concepts, Inc. continues to add large format photo books to its catalogue, including Authentic Wave: The Surf Photography of Tatsuo Takei, HI1K: Ten Years, Ron Church: CA/HI 60-6 5, and Surf Book: Michael Halsband and Joel Tudor.

== Television ==
In 1998, The Surfers Journal created their own TV series for Outside TV, with 3 seasons of 10 episodes. The seasons were "50 Years of Surf on Film" (1996), "Great Waves" (1998), and "Biographies" (2001).

The series was directed by Ira Opper, written by Matt Warshaw, narrated by Robert "Wingnut" Weaver, and produced by Steve Pezman, Debbee Pezman and Ira Opper.

"Biographies" episodes (2001):

-Gerry Lopez

-Robert August

-Terry Fitzgerald

-Barry Kanaiapuni

-Cheyne Horan

-Jeff Hakman

-Larry Bertlemann

-Rabbit Kekai

-Wayne Lynch

-Shaun Tomson

-Mark Richards

-Kelly Slater

-Nat Young

-Joel Tudor

"Great Waves" episodes (1998):

-Pipeline

-Narrabeen

-Kirra

-Bells Beach

-Waimea

-Honolua Bay

-G-Land

-Tavarua

-Maverick's

-Huntington Beach

"50 Years of Surfing on Film" (1996):

-Bud Browne

-Bruce Brown

-John Severson

-Bill Delaney

-Greg Noll

-Hal Jepson

-Scott Dittrich

-George Greenough

-Greg MacGillivray

-John Witzig & Albee Falzon
