= John Garcia Thompson =

British beach volleyball player

John Garcia Thompson (born 8 June 1979 in Palma, Majorca, Spain) is a British beach volleyball player.

As of 2012, Garcia Thompson is 1.92 metres (6 ft 4 in) tall and weighs 92 kilograms (203 lb). He competes for the Palma Son Amar club and is coached by Alfredo Zamora.

From 2009 to 2010 Garcia Thompson competed alongside Robin Miedzybrodzki. In 2011 he teamed up with fellow British player Steve Grotowski; the pair achieved a best finish of seventeenth at the 2011 Fédération Internationale de Volleyball (FIVB) Open in Shanghai, China. At the 2011 Swatch World Tour Prague Open the pair defeated the top seeded American pairing of Casey Jennings and Kevin Wong 25–23, 24–22 in the first round of competition but were then beaten 19–21, 16–21 by Josh Binstock and Richard Van Huizen of Canada in the second round.

Garcia Thompson and Grotowski were selected to compete for Great Britain at the 2012 Summer Olympics after being chosen ahead of Gregg Weaver and Jody Gooding. Both pairs competed in the minimum twelve FIVB events require for qualification with Grotowski and Garcia Thompson earning 522 rankings points compared to Weaver and Gooding's 354 points. The pair qualified for the Games despite public funding for the men's event being withdrawn in 2010. Grotowski and Garcia Thompson will become the first ever British men to compete in beach volleyball at the Olympics. The men's event will take place between 28 July and 9 August at Horse Guards Parade. Garcia Thompson said of his selection "For an athlete, there is nothing better than being selected to compete at an Olympic Games".
