= Mickey Munoz =

American surfer and surfboard shaper

Personal information
- Born: Mickey Muñoz; 1937 (age 88–89) New York, New York, U.S.
- Years active: 1957–present
- Website: www.mickeymunoz.com

Surfing career
- Sport: Surfing

Mickey Muñoz, aka Mickey Munoz, nicknamed "The Mongoose," (born 1937) is an early surfing pioneer, sailor, paddleboarder, skier, and surfboard shaper.

He was featured in the 2004 surfing documentary Riding Giants. He currently resides in Capistrano Beach, California and designs boards for Surftech, a manufacturer of epoxy boards.

Born in New York City in 1937, he graduated from Santa Monica High School. He was part of the surfing scene at Malibu and was present on June 27, 1956, the day a young lady showed up and Terry "Tubesteak" Tracy nicknamed her "Gidget". Later, he was cast as the surfing stunt double for Sandra Dee in the 1959 film Gidget wearing a 2-piece bikini.

Muñoz developed a variety of unconventional, sometimes humorous, yet highly difficult surfing stances. While surfing in Malibu with Bobby Patterson, Muñoz found the wave so perfect that they entertained themselves with different poses. "We had the mysterioso, the el spontáneo, the el telephono, and others -- all just stupid, spontaneous moves that made us laugh." While Muñoz and John Severson were reviewing his recent film footage, they were giving the stances names: "At the time, we were naming these stances and poses, and we came up with the name Quasimodo, because it sort of looked like the Hunchback of Notre Dame." Muñoz's stance then became famous when Severson published the image in 1960 in the first issue of SURFER magazine (which used the different spelling "quasimoto").

== Honors ==
In 2006 the Huntington Beach Surfing Walk of Fame honored Muñoz as its "2006 Surf Pioneer."

The Mongoose Cup paddleboarding event honoring Mickey Muñoz was created in the early 2000s at Dana Point harbor and sponsored by the Doheny Longboard Surfing Assoc. in partnership with the City of Dana Point. Muñoz participated in promoting stand-up paddleboarding safety and etiquette education.

A life-size cast bronze statue of Mickey Muñoz by William Limebrook was unveiled on May 14, 2026 at Watermen's Plaza, Dana Point, California, that depicts Muñoz in his dynamic and iconic Quasimodo stance. It was Limebrook's tenth life-size cast bronze statue of famous surfing and watersport athletes, filmmakers, artists, and entrepreneurs at Watermen's Plaza.
