= California Free Former =

American skateboard manufacturer

California Free Former was the world's largest skateboard manufacturer during the 1970s. From 1970 to 1981, it was owned by Rick Smith of ALS Industries with business partner Steve Silberman. They also held several licenses from Walt Disney, manufacturing roller skates and other Disney brand consumer products.

== Free Former professional skaters ==
The prominent Free Former skaters included:

- Ty Page
- Mark Bowden
- Curt Lindgren
- Bryan Beardsley
- Laura Thornhill
- Steve Ibbertson (Canada)
- Glenn McCarroll

== World Skateboard Championships ==
California Free Former also used to sponsor skateboarding competitions, including the California Free Former World Skateboard Championships held at the Long Beach Sports Arena. (Original and reenacted footage from the Free Former World Skateboard Championships was prominently featured in the feature film Lords of Dogtown.)

The California Free Former World Professional Skateboard Championships were held at the Long Beach Arena in California. The first competition in the summer of 1976 was the largest skateboard competition ever held up until that time. Its significant cash prizes changed skateboarding history and created a professional tier in the sport.

=== 1976 results ===
- Men's Freestyle: 1-Chris Chaput, 2-Ed Nadalin, 3-Mike Weed, 4-Gary Kocot, 5-Russ Howell
- Men's Slalom: 1-Henry Hester, 2-Bob Piercy, 3-Mike Williams
- Women's Freestyle: 1-Ellen Berryman, 2-Laura Thornhill, 3-Ellen O’Neal
- Women's Slalom: 1-Desiree Von Essen, 2-Terry Brown, 3-Robin Logan
- Consecutive 360s: 1-Bob Jarvis, 2-Chris Chaput, 3-Gary Kocot, 4- Steve Shipp, 5-Ed Nadalin

=== Sept 24-25, 1977 results ===
- Men's Freestyle: 1-Bob Mohr, 2-Mike Weed, 3-Ty Page, 4-Ed Nadalin
- Men's Slalom: 1-John Hutson, 6.515 seconds 2-Bobby Piercy, 6.526 sec. 3-Randy Smith, 6.605 sec. 4-Greg Taie, 6.612 sec.
- Women's Freestyle: 1-Ellen Berryman, 2-Ellen O’Neal, 3-Laura Thornhill
- Women's Slalom: 1-Terry Brown, 2-Kim Cespedes, 3-Desiree Von Essen
- Consecutive 360s: 1-Russ Howell, 2-Paul Hoffman, 3-Ed Nadalin, 4-Steve Shipp
- High Jump: 1- Bryan Beardsley, 2-Jerry Pattison, 3-Brent McCullogh
- Barrel Jump: 1-Tony Alva (17 barrels), 2-Paul Hoffman, 3-Ed Nadalin, 4-Steve Shipp

The poster for the 1977 event was done by artist / designer Jim Evans.
