= Surfer Publications =

Defunct American magazine publisher

- Founded: 1960
- Founder: John Severson
- Headquarters location: 33046 Calle Aviador, San Juan Capistrano, California
- Publication types: Skateboarder, Surfer, Roller Skating Magazine

Surfer Publications, Inc. was a magazine publisher based in Dana Point, California, active since at least the 1970s. A For Better Living Inc. Company, they are known for publishing Skateboarder, Surfer, and Roller Skating Magazine.

John Severson founded the company to promote his third film, Surf Fever.

Roller Skating Magazine was published near-monthly at least from 1979 to 1981, during the height of the roller disco craze.
