= Bryce Kanights =

American photographer and skateboarder

Bryce Kanights is an American photographer and former professional skateboarder internationally recognized for his photographs of skateboarding.

== Career ==
Kanights grew up in San Francisco, California, photographing and skateboarding throughout the city. Kanights was the first skateboarder to be sponsored by Billabong but earned very little money from the sponsorship and his photography continued to be his primary source of income. Kanights worked for Thrasher for many years. As he describes on his website, he started shooting his first photographs as a teenager, when he was skateboarding in San Francisco. Since then his passion for photography only grew, until he was able to make it a career.

He was inducted into the Skateboarding Hall of Fame in 2026.

== Career ==
In his portfolio, Kanights has many big brands, such as:

- Apple
- Quiksilver
- Hurley
- Adidas
- GoPro
- Volcom
- Vans
- Levi's
- ESPN
- Konami
- Oakley
- Fox Racing
- EA Sports
- Bell Sports
- Da Kine
- Sutro Eyewear
- Pro-Tec
- Activision
- Nike
- Red Bull
- Skully Candy
- HUF
- Alli Sports
- Dew Tour
- FTC. Stance
- Street League
- Monster Energy
- Mountain Dew
- VICE Media
- Skateboarder
- Kingpin
- Juice
- Thrasher
