= Cindy Whitehead =

American professional skateboarder, sports stylist, and activist

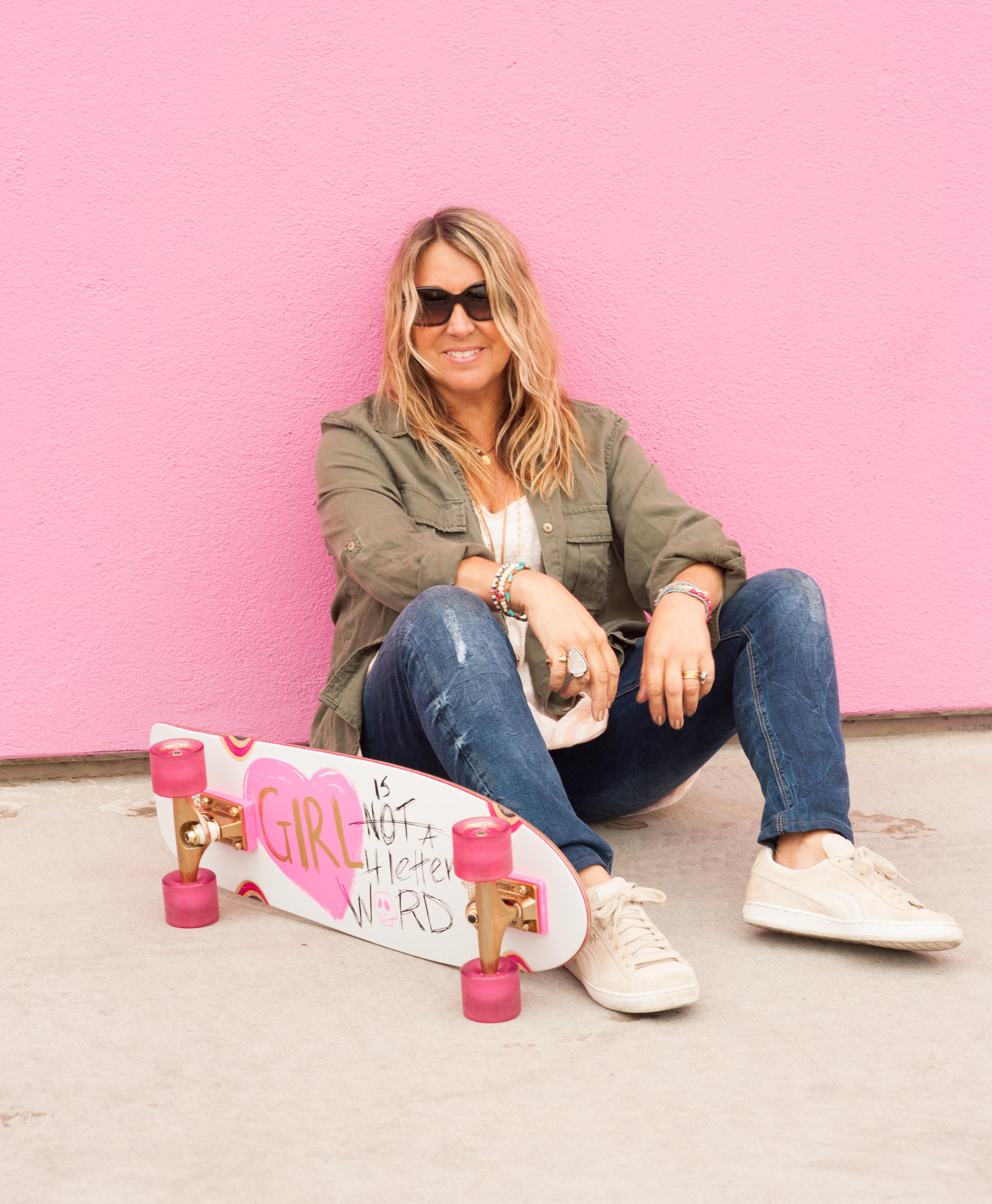
- Whitehead, skateboarder and sports stylist. Photo by Ian Logan.
- Born: June 15, 1962 (age 64)
- Occupation: Skateboarder

Cindy Whitehead (born June 15, 1962) is an American professional skateboarder and activist. A pioneer of vertical skateboarding, she was inducted into the Skateboarding Hall of Fame in 2016. She is married to photographer Ian R. Logan.

== Skateboarding career ==
Whitehead began freestyle skateboarding at Hermosa Beach Pier, California, alongside notable skateboarders such as Steve Rocco. After the opening of Skateboard World Skatepark in Torrance, California she began skating halfpipe.

In early 1978 she competed at the Hang Ten Olympics at Magic Mountain, in California representing Skateboard World Skatepark and performing a freestyle skateboard routine to The Steve Miller Band's song, "Swingtown". Whitehead placed third for girls ages 13–17. Also in 1978, She was approached by photographer Bruce Hazelton to shoot a series of photos of her skateboarding the plexiglass 360 ramp at Fountain Valley Skatepark in Fountain Valley, California, for Wild World of Skateboarding Magazine. The photo and an article were published in the June 1978 issue, making her the first woman to have a center photographic feature and two page profile in skateboarding. At the 1978 Skateboarding Nationals she placed 4th among the women in her age group.

In 1980 she joined the Sims Skateboard team owned by Tom Sims. Its team members at the time included; Brad Bowman, Bert LaMar, George Orton, Mike Folmer, and Marc Hollander. She was the only female team rider at the time. Also in 1980, Whitehead was invited to compete as a pro in The Gold Cup Series which staged five pool riding contests at skateparks up and down California. Overall she placed third in the series.

== Post-skateboarding career ==
After retiring from professional skateboarding in 1984 she became a sports stylist for athletes and brands, doing work on campaigns for Nike and Adidas as well as several well-known athletes.

=== Supporting women skateboarders ===
In 2013 Whitehead created the "Girl is NOT a 4 Letter Word" brand. She teamed up with Dwindle Distribution to produce a line of signature boards under the Dusters California brand. The project has continued through 2020. In 2014 Girl is NOT a 4 Letter Word came out with a signature helmet in a collaboration with XS Helmets. In 2020 Girl is NOT a 4 Letter Word released a on a retro style, signature collab helmet with S1 Helmets.

In 2017, she placed female skate images on two back to back billboards on Sunset Blvd. in Los Angeles, CA to show recognition for females in the sport.

On February 28, 2019 she placed advertising on electronic billboards in Times Square, NY, with female skateboarders on it and the text "GIRLS SKATE TOO."

Whitehead is the author of a book on women's skateboarding titled It's Not About Pretty: A Book About Radical Female Skaters. She has also written forwards for two books; Graphic anthology "Femme Magnifique" as well as the photo book Skater Girls by Jenny Sampson.

In 2022, Whitehead and Girl is NOT a 4 Letter Word collaborated with S1 Helmets and Pom Pom Skateboards to release new products.

=== Public speaking ===
In 2013 she was on a panel at The Smithsonian Museum's INNOSKATE event in Washington, D.C. about skateboarding and fashion, with fellow skateboarder Brian Anderson.

In 2014 she delivered at TEDx talk in Santa Monica, CA titled "Girl is NOT a 4 Letter Word: About growing up in a male dominated sport and how I dealt with it."

In 2019 she gave a 10-minute "Power Talk" at the 10th annual espnW conference in Laguna Niguel, California titled "Rule Breaking, Disruption and Starting a Revolultion."

On September 21, 2021 she moderated and spoke on a panel at The Smithsonian Youth Summit on Gender Equity.

== Accolades ==
In 2016 Whitehead was inducted into the Skateboarding Hall of Fame with an introduction by Joan Jett.

Items from her 1970s skate history as well as prototypes from the Girl is NOT a 4 Letter Word collection are in the Smithsonian Museum of American History's sports collections in Washington, D.C., as well as in the Smithsonian Museum's "Girlhood (It's Complicated)" exhibit that opened October 8, 2020.
