= Steve Grotowski =

British beach volleyball player

Steven 'Steve' Grotowski (born 30 May 1982 in London) is a British beach volleyball player.

As of 2012, Grotowski is 1.98 metres (6 ft 6 in) tall and weighs 92 kilograms (203 lb). He is coached by Morph Bowes. He lives in Boynton Beach, Florida, United States and has dual British and US citizenship. He attended the University of New Haven where he began playing indoor volleyball before switching his focus to beach volleyball.

Grotowski won the Volleyball England Beach Championship at Brighton in 2007 partnered by Jody Gooding.

From 2007 to 2011 Grotowski was partnered by Gregg Weaver. The pair achieved a best finish of ninth position in a 2009 Challenger event in Cyprus and also had five top-twenty finishes in Fédération Internationale de Volleyball (FIVB) Open events. In 2011 he teamed up with fellow British player John Garcia Thompson; the pair achieved a best finish of seventeenth at the 2011 FIVB Open in Shanghai, China. At the 2011 Swatch World Tour Prague Open the pair defeated the top seeded American pairing of Casey Jennings and Kevin Wong 25–23, 24–22 in the first round of competition but were then beaten 19–21, 16–21 by Josh Binstock and Richard Van Huizen of Canada in the second round.

Competing with Adrian Carambula, Grotowski finished runner-up at the 2012 Belmar open; the number three seeds were beaten 14–21, 21–23 by Ryan Doherty and Casey Patterson in the final.

Grotowski and John Garcia Thompson were selected to compete for Great Britain at the 2012 Summer Olympics after being chosen ahead of Gregg Weaver and Jody Gooding. Both pairs competed in the minimum twelve FIVB events require for qualification with Grotowski and Garcia Thompson earning 522 rankings points compared to Weaver and Gooding's 354 points. Grotowski and Garcia Thompson became the first ever British men to compete in beach volleyball at the Olympics.
