= Slalom skateboarding =

Form of downhill skateboard racing

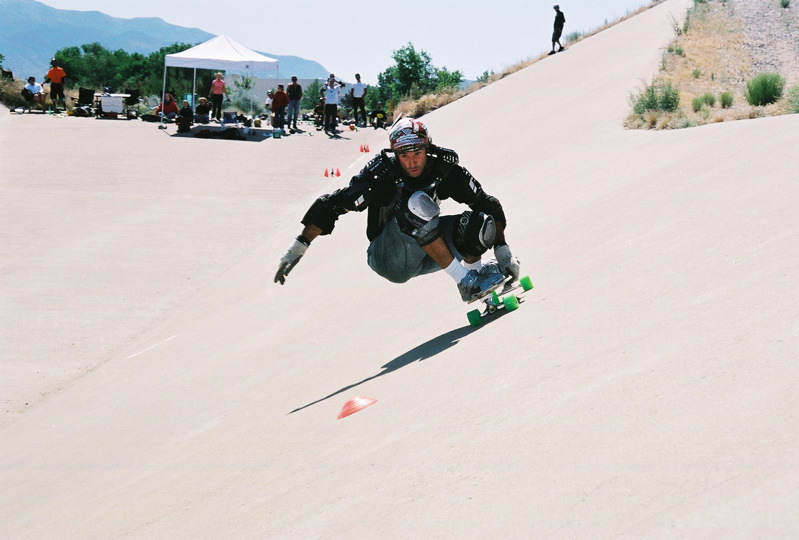
A slalom skateboarder in a drainage ditch. This discipline is often called banked slalom.

Slalom skateboarding is a form of downhill skateboard racing that first appeared in the 1960s and 1970s and has made a resurgence in popularity in the 2000s. Slalom racers skate down a course usually marked by plastic cones. The racer tries to get through the course with the fastest time, while knocking down the fewest cones. Each cone typically carries a penalty of a fraction of a second (most often 0.1 seconds) which is added to the skater's time.

== Disciplines ==
Races can be done in dual format where the racing is a head-to-head match, or in a single lane format where the racer is only racing against the clock. There are five types of Slalom race formats: Super Giant Slalom, Giant Slalom, Hybrid Slalom (a.k.a. Special Slalom), Tight Slalom, and Banked Slalom. The Super Giant Slalom, or SuperG, is characterized by fast speeds of 30-40 mph, very long distances between cones (up to 40–50 feet) and run times of around 1 minute. Giant Slalom is similar to SuperG but typically has shorted cone distances, more cones, and is often run in a single lane format. Hybrid or Special slalom is a combination of Giant Slalom cone spacings of 10-15' and tight cones spacings of 5-7' and is most often run head-to-head. Tight Slalom is characterized by very short cone distances of 5'-7' and has the highest frequency of turns. Tight slalom skaters will pass through 3-4 cones per second. Banked slalom involves skating through a course on banked walls, such as in a skatepark or in a drainage ditch. Banked slalom is similar to other forms of slalom except that it is almost never head-to-head and the course weaves through a non-level obstacle course, as opposed to a regular street where other forms of slalom are held.

== Rules ==
Skaters are penalized a certain amount of time for each cone that they hit during a race. This penalty time is added to the racers' run time. If too many cones are hit during the run, the racer receives a Disqualification. A DQ is often penalized in head-to-head racing with a severe time penalty that is rarely made up in the second heat of a head-to-head race.

Another group of rules known as "Grass Roots" rules may be used to simplify the racing environment. In grass roots rules, racers are allowed to hit a certain maximum number of cones. Below the maximum (often 5 cones) there is no penalty, and above the maximum is a DQ.

In all types of head-to-head racing, race order is determined by a qualifying time which determines the brackets for head-to-head match-ups.

== Equipment ==
Slalom skateboards are optimized to increase speed, turning, and traction. Slalom skateboard wheels are generally softer (durometers between 76A and 90A) and larger than a typical skateboard wheel (diameter 66 - 75 mm). This increases the wheels' roll speed and grip. Skateboard trucks for slalom racing are often hand-machined precision products that include high rebound bushings, spherical bearings, and precision ground 8mm axles. Slalom trucks are different from most regular skateboard trucks, having different geometry for the front vs the rear truck. The front truck provides increased steering capability whereas the rear truck provides a more stable trajectory. Wedged (or angled) rubber pads (initially known as Rad Pads) mounted under the trucks, shifting the angle of the king pin, can be used to achieve similar performance with standard skateboard trucks. Skateboard decks (or boards) for slalom racing are generally slightly longer than typical skateboards, while still shorter than longboards. They are also more narrow suitable for truck widths of 100 to 120 mm. Materials may include carbon fiber and foam cores, to increase board responsiveness and strength. In the 1970s and 80's they initially had significant flex which provided a smooth ride, but as competitions got more intense racers favored decks completely without flex such as solid wood, rigid maple ply or carbon fiber.

== Racers ==
Some of the early stars of Slalom racing were Henry Hester, Bobby Piercy and John Hutson. These skaters won many of the races of the 1970s. Immediately following the rebirth of the sport in the 2000s, with the organization of the 2001 World Championships of Slalom, put on by Jack Smith in Morro Bay, CA, racers such as Gary Cross, Paul Dunn, John Gilmour, and Charlie Ransom dominated. In the following years some of the most successful racers were Kenny Mollica and Jason Mitchell in the US, Luca Giammarco (ITA), Maurus Strobel (SUI) and Dominik Kowalski (GER) in Europe for the men's division. In the women's division Lynn Kramer (USA), multiple World Champion, really stands out, winning 17 overall titles. Other top level racing women of this period include the 2003 World Champion, 1970s legend Judi Oyama (USA) and the Europeans Kathrin Sehl (GER) and Lienite Skaraine (LAT).

In the 2010's Joe McLaren (USA) won more men's World Championship titles than any other racer, although he is regularly facing tough competition from Europeans such as Janis Kuzmins (LAT), Christopher and Michel Dupont (FRA) and the brothers Viking and Viktor Hadestrand (SWE).

The 2025 International Slalom Championships were held in Sao Paulo, Brazil with disciplines in tight, hybrid and giant slalom. The overall winners in the Men's division were Gustavs Gailītis (LAT), Petr Martinů (CZE), Orion Lehrmann (USA), and Janis Kuzmins (LAT). In the Women's division overall winners were Leiola Kahaku (USA), Lynn Kramer (USA), Dominika Ozolina (LAT) and Judy Oyama (USA).

World rankings in slalom skateboarding are maintained by the International Slalom Skateboarding Association (ISSA) and World Skate, the two sanctioning bodies for slalom skateboarding, and are regularly updated based on dozens of sanctioned races from around the world.

In 2025 the top ranked Men's racers are Gustavs Gailītis, Petr Martinů, Orion Lehrmann, and Joe McLaren.

In 2025 the top ranked Women's racers are Lynn Kramer, Karolina Vojtova, Leiola Kahaku, Dominika Ozolina

Among the women Lynn Kramer still holds the top spot in the world rankings and has 17 World Championships in her skating career, but Leiola Kahaku has come on strong in 2025 winning the International Championships in Brazil and coming in 2nd to Kramer at the US Nationals.

== See also ==
- Lynn Kramer, skateboarder, 17× world champion in slalom racing
