= Skateboarding styles =

A skateboard style refers to the way a skateboarder can ride a skateboard. Styles of skateboarding have evolved and are influenced by a number of factors including sociocultural evolution, mass media, music, technology, and corporate influence.

The styles used by different skateboarders when riding skateboards should not be confused with skater style, the manner in which skateboarders dress or act in relation to skateboarding culture.

== Styles ==
=== Freestyle ===
Probably the oldest style of skateboarding, freestyle skateboarding developed from the use of skateboards as a mode of transport in the 1960s. Professional freestyle competitions often involved music and choreography and focused on fluidity and technical skill. The style changed significantly with the introduction of ollies and other tricks in the 1980s and the introduction of various obstacle elements. The emphasis in freestyle is technical flat ground skateboarding. Often a freestyler will need little more than a board and a smooth, flat surface. Music and choreography have always been an essential part of the professional freestyle routine.

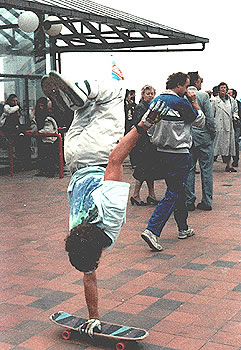
Freestyle skateboarding

=== Vert ===
Vert skateboarding has its genesis in "pool riding" - the riding of skateboards in emptied backyard swimming pools - during the 1970s. It involves skateboard riders moving from the horizontal (on the ground) to the vertical (on a ramp or other incline) to perform tricks - thus "vert". It is also referred to as "transition skateboarding". Skateboarders usually set-up their boards with 55mm (or larger) wheels and wider decks for more stability.

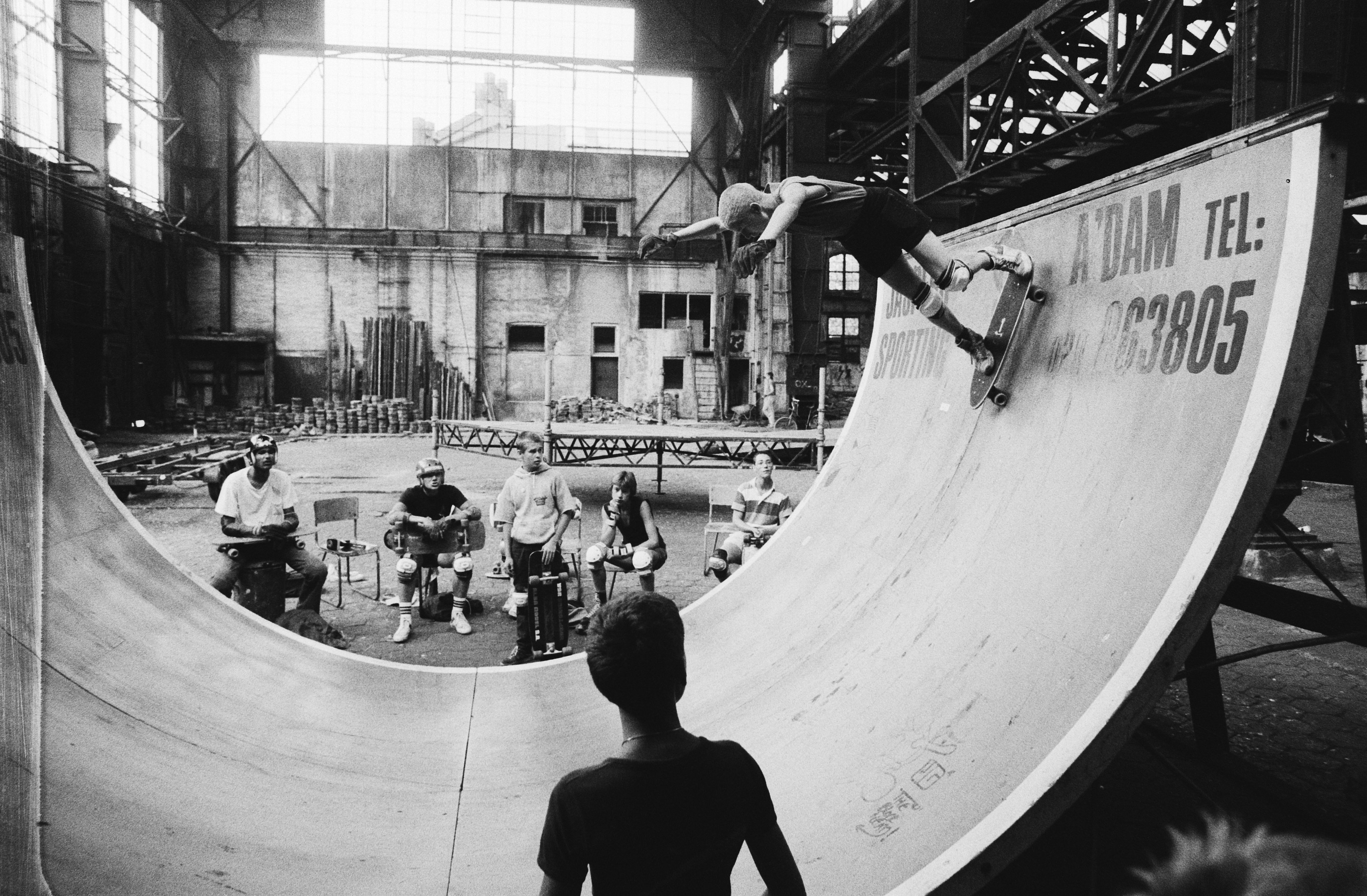
Vert skateboarding

=== Street ===
Street skateboarding involves the use of urban obstacles like stairs and their handrails, planter boxes, drainage ditches, park benches and other street furniture. Skaters perform tricks around, on, onto or over these obstacles. Skateboarders usually set-up their boards with 55mm (or smaller) wheels and narrower decks to make the board flip and spin faster and to make performing flip tricks easier. Skateboard parts can be individually repaired or replaced should they require maintenance.

Prominent professional skateboarders design and endorse professional skateboard shoes, often with their name or logo. Some of the most prolific pro skateboard shoe designers include Eric Koston, Daewon Song, Kareem Campbell, Chad Muska, Andrew Reynolds, Marc Johnson, Geoff Rowley, and Anthony Van Engelen. Each of them has several iconic "pro model" designs mass-produced and sold as part of endorsement contracts with various professional skate shoe manufacturers.

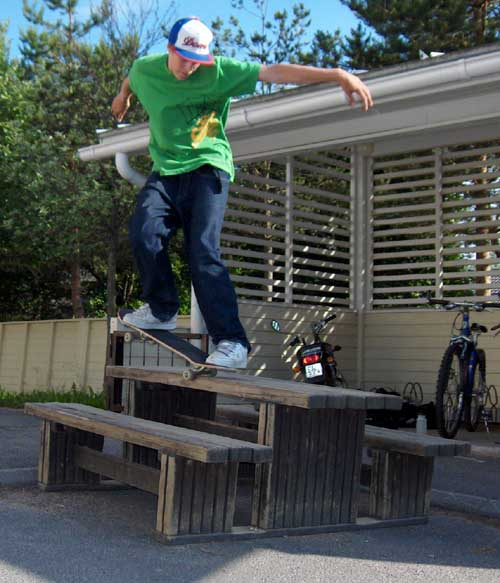
A skateboarder making use of street furniture.

=== Park ===
Park skateboarding encompasses a variety of sub-styles adopted by those who ride skateboards in purpose-built skate parks. Most skate parks combine halfpipes and quarterpipes with various other "vert" skateboarding features as well as "street" obstacles such as stairs, ledges, and rails. The integration of these elements produces a different skating experience.

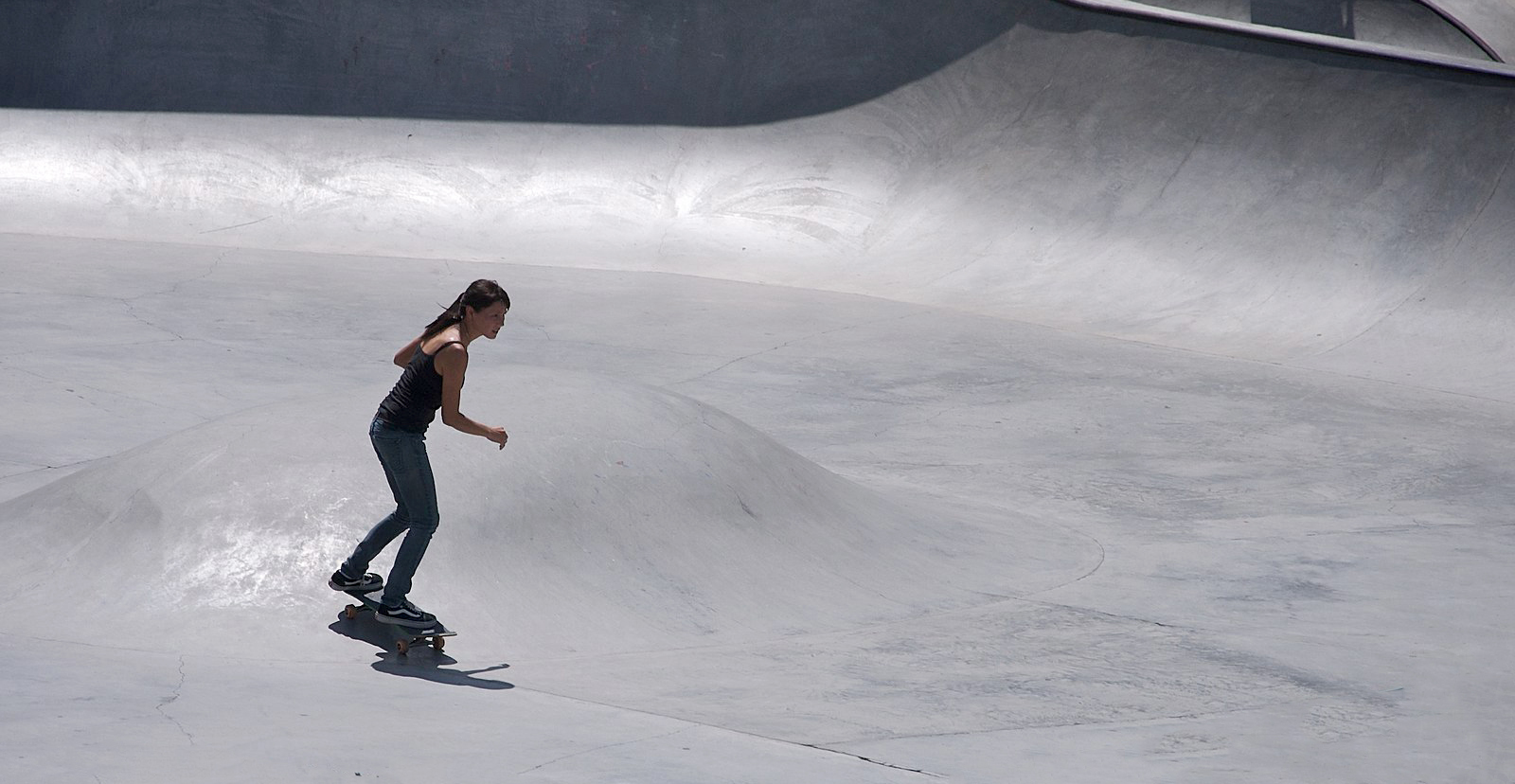
Skatepark with one skateboarder riding

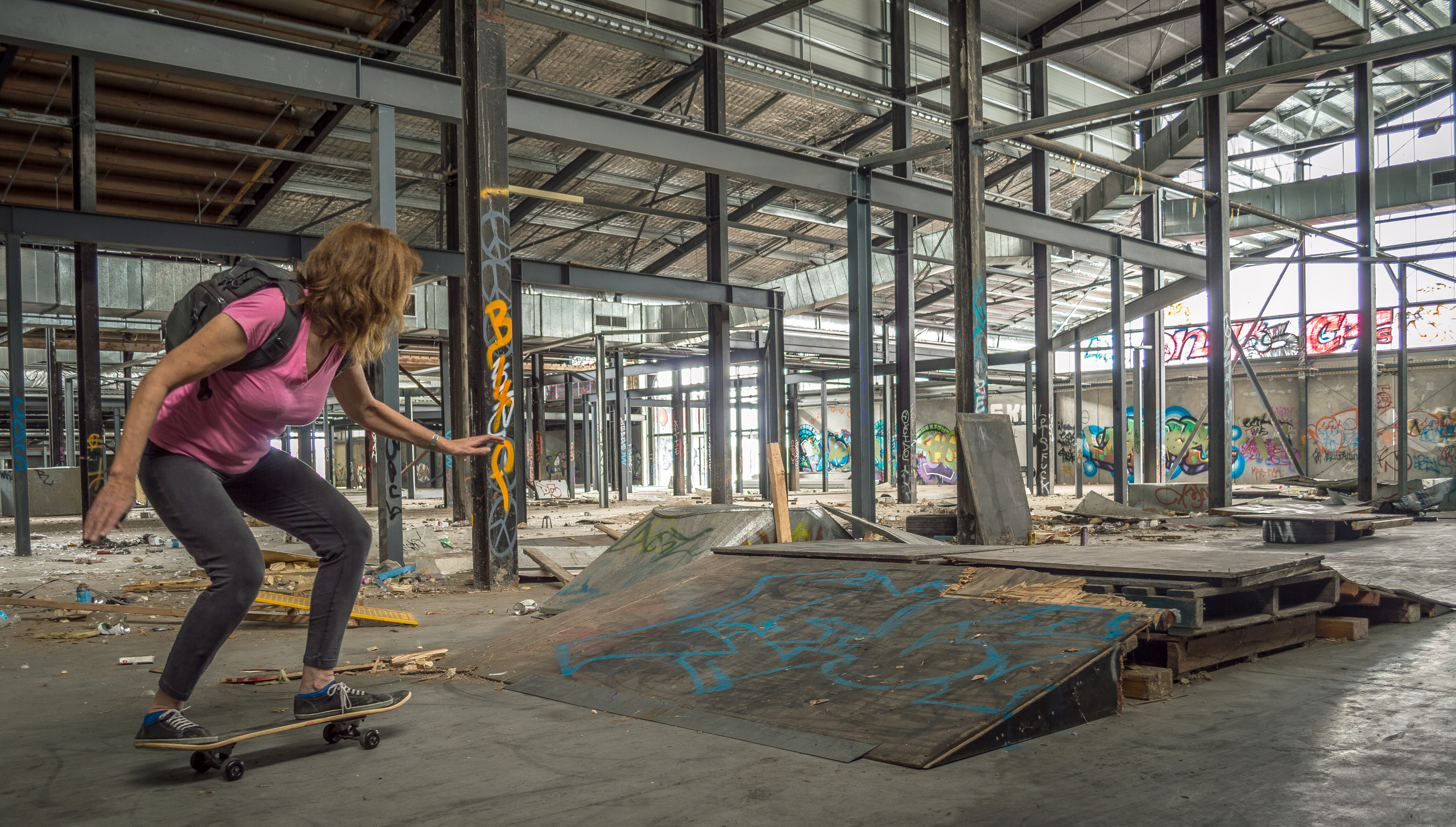
Indoor skatepark with one skateboarder riding a ramp

=== Slalom ===
Slalom skateboarding is a style of skateboarding that requires the rider to skate down a semi steep marked run carving through evenly spaced markers, such as orange parking cones. Slalom skateboarding was one of the earliest defined styles of competitive skateboarding. Slalom skateboarding requires precision and control while riding at a higher speed than can be achieved through a conventional skateboard push. Speeds achieved during slalom racing can often be in excess of 30 mph. Slalom skateboarding racing is often identified as the precursor to the even more specialized style of competitive downhill skateboard racing.

=== Cruising ===
Cruising can be achieved with any type of skateboard through general urban areas without tricks. Skateboarders in this category often use "cruisers" which are generally wider and have rubbery wheels. Cruising, similarly to Downhill Skateboarding, is often used for transportation.

=== Downhill ===
Downhill skateboarding, with its early 1970s origins, is one of the oldest styles of skateboarding. For modern non-competition downhill skateboarding, longboards are most often used. To increase grip at higher speeds, softer urethane wheels are typically used for downhill skateboarding. Modern competitive riders use specialized longboards and precision trucks for races. Professional downhill skateboard racers often reach speeds around 60 mph during races. The fastest speeds recorded have been above 90 mph. There have been multiple worldwide governing bodies that have offered competitive downhill racing circuits. The International Gravity Sports Association (IGSA) and the International Downhill Federation (IDF), both defunct, were the most recent of these governing bodies.

=== Other styles ===
- Big air Skateboarding was invented when Danny Way and DC Shoes created the "Mega Ramp", with a giant "roll in" for speed followed by a large launch ramp, a (approximately) 50 foot gap and (approximately) 25 foot quarterpipe. It has recently become popular enough to be an event in the X-games, and other obstacles are being added such as rails in the gap.
- Grass surfing
