= Manual roll =

Skateboard trick

The Manual Roll is a skateboarding technique in which a rider balances on the rear wheels as part of a larger trick sequence. The maneuver is derived from the manual, a technique in which the rider maintains balance on the rear wheels without allowing the tail of the skateboard to touch the ground. Unlike a manual performed in isolation, the manual roll is typically incorporated into other tricks, such as ollie variations or transfers between obstacles, increasing both technical difficulty and stylistic complexity.

== History ==
The manual roll is credited to Pat Ngoho, who developed the technique in the late 1970s.

== Usage and technique ==
The manual roll is considered properly executed when the rider maintains controlled balance on the rear wheels without scraping the tail of the skateboard. The technique is used across multiple disciplines of skateboarding, including street, transition, and pool skating.

== Impact on Skateboarding ==
The manual roll has been cited as an influential technique in the development of modern skateboarding, particularly in the progression of technical, combination-based tricks. It is often discussed alongside foundational maneuvers such as the ollie and the kickflip, which contributed to the evolution of contemporary skateboarding styles.

== Competitions and Events ==
Manual‑based tricks, including variations of the manual roll, have been showcased in skateboarding contests that emphasize technical balance and trick combinations. One of the earliest and most prominent examples is Red Bull Manny Mania, a competition series focused on technical manual skateboarding organized by Red Bull. First held in 2007 in Venice Beach and other U.S. cities, the event has featured pro and amateur skaters performing manual tricks over custom obstacles and has returned in subsequent years to celebrate technical manual skating. At pro stops, established skaters such as Joey Brezinski and Ronnie Creager have competed for top honors, while later editions have included digital and amateur formats to broaden participation and highlight progression in manual technique.
