= Pat Ngoho =

American visual artist and skateboarder

Patrick John Ngoho
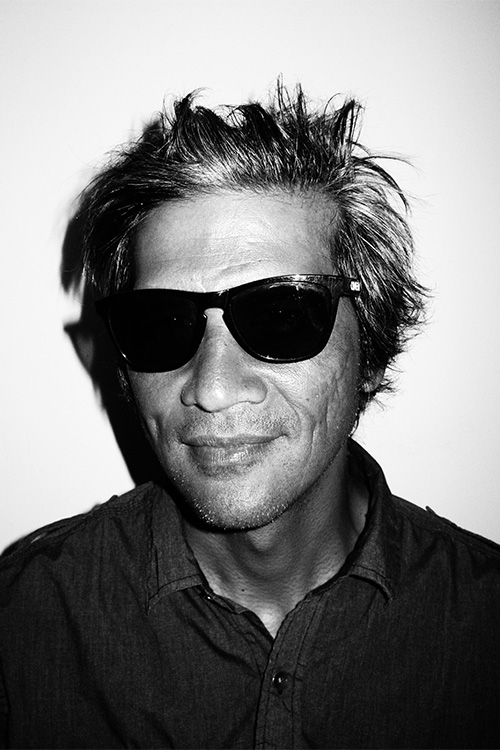
- Ngoho, New York 2014
- Born: Los Angeles, California, U.S.
- Education: Loyola Marymount University
- Known for: Manual Roll
- Movement: Contemporary art
- Awards: inducted into the Skateboarding Hall of Fame (2025)

Pat Ngoho is an American artist and skateboarder known for his contributions to modern skateboarding, including the invention of the Manual Roll, as well as his work in the visual arts.

He was inducted into the Skateboarding Hall of Fame in 2025.
