= Skateboard (film) =

- Directed by: George Gage
- Written by: Richard A. Wolf; George Gage
- Produced by: Harry N. Blum
- Starring: Allen Garfield; Kathleen Lloyd; Leif Garrett; Tony Alva; Ellen O'Neal
- Cinematography: Ross Kelsay
- Edited by: Robert Angus
- Music by: Mark Snow
- Production company: Blum Group
- Distributed by: Universal Pictures
- Release date: February 1, 1978
- Running time: 97 minutes
- Country: United States
- Language: English
- Box office: $1.3 million (US)

Skateboard is a 1978 American sports drama film directed by George Gage and starring Allen Garfield and Leif Garrett. Tony Alva has a cameo as "Tony Bluetile".

== Overview ==
Manny Bloom, a Hollywood agent, finds himself in debt to Sol, a powerful bookmaker. To make a fast buck, he creates a team of skateboarders and dares them in a downhill race for $20,000.

== Cast ==
- Allen Garfield as Manny Bloom
- Kathleen Lloyd as Millicent Broderick
- Leif Garrett as Brad Harris
- Tony Alva as Tony Bluetile
- Ellen O'Neal as Jenny Bradshaw
- Richard Van der Wyk as Jason Maddox
- Steve Monahan as Peter Steffens
- David Hyde as Dennis
- Pam Kenneally as Randi
- Antony Carbone as Sol
- Gordon Jump as Mr. Harris
- Pat Hitchcock as Mrs. Harris
- Orson Bean as himself
- Bruce Logan as competitive skateboarder
