= Billy Ruff =

American skateboarder

Billy Ruff is an American former professional skateboarder best known for his vert skating career during the 1980s. He was a member of the Gordon & Smith (G&S) team and was one of the most influential vert skaters of his era. Ruff was known for his style, contest success, and signature pro model boards. In 2021, he was inducted into the Skateboarding Hall of Fame.

== Early life ==
Billy Ruff was born in 1964 in Fitchburg, Massachusetts. He grew up an only child in a military family and moved frequently before settling in San Diego, California, at age 12. It was in San Diego where he first became immersed in skateboarding culture and began skating vert ramps, empty pools, Oasis Skatepark, and later Del Mar.

== Skateboarding career ==
At age 13, he was asked to join the G&S skateboard team as a sponsored amateur, turning professional at 15. During the early to mid-1980s, he became one of the most prominent vert skaters, known for his powerful lines, speed, smooth skating style, and high-flying aerial tricks, earning his nickname, The Ruffian. He is credited with inventing The Unit, a frontside 540 aerial, which was also the first 540 landed (on a skateboard) on vert, pre-dating Mike McGill's McTwist by several years. Ruff's stalled inverts were also legendary.

Between 1983 and 1985, Ruff won over 15 major contests and appeared regularly in skateboarding magazines such as Thrasher and TransWorld Skateboarding. Ruff's signature pro model decks for G&S featured iconic graphics such as the “Chalice,” “Invisible Man,” "Puppet Smash," and “Puppet Bomb,” and are now considered collector’s items.

== Later life and legacy ==
After retiring from professional skateboarding in the late-1980s, he worked for Airwalk for 12 years, then moved to shoe company Sole Technology. Later he founded the company Sha Sha Fine Shoes, which closed in 2010. He now has a career building cell phone towers. In the 2010s, Ruff reconnected with the skateboarding community and continued to promote the sport through local events in San Diego. In 2020, Ruff organized a Skate-a-Thon to raise funds to cover the medical expenses of his friend Daymond D. Dodge, a skateboard collector and archivist, who faced an ALS diagnosis. In 2025, Ruff helped organize Sk8Jam with the San Diego Police Department.

== See also ==
- List of professional skateboarders
- Skateboarding Hall of Fame
