= Judi Oyama =

American professional skateboarder

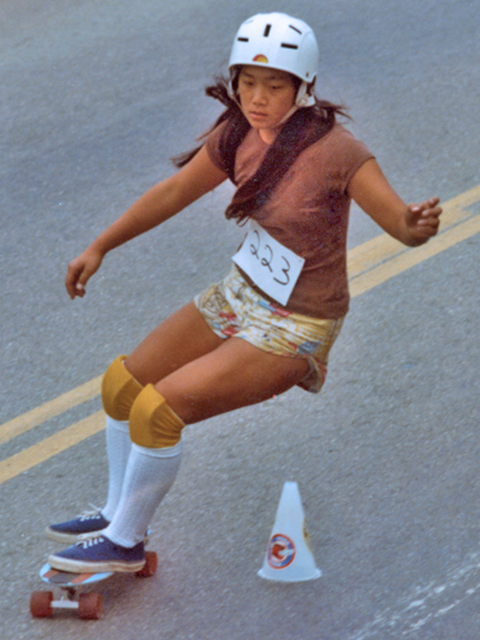
- Oyama in 1976

Personal information
- Born: Judi Oyama; 1959 (age 66–67) Santa Cruz, California, U.S.
- Occupation: Skateboarder
- Years active: 1973–present

Sport
- Country: United States
- Sport: Skateboarding
- Events: Slalom; Downhill
- Turned pro: 1976

Judi Oyama (22 October 1959) is an American professional skateboarder who excelled in slalom and downhill skateboarding. She was the Women's Slalom World Skateboard Champion in 2003 and was inducted into the Skateboarding Hall of Fame in 2018. In 2024, she was included in the Guinness World Records as the oldest competitive female skateboarder.

== Early life ==
Judi Oyama was born in 1959, in Santa Cruz, California to parents of Japanese heritage. She began skateboarding at 13 years of age in her driveway. Her brother built her first skateboard in his wood shop class at Aptos Junior High. She attended Aptos High School and was inducted into the Aptos High School Sports Hall of Fame in 2017. One of her first jobs was assembling and silkscreening skateboards for the Santa Cruz skateboard company NHS, or NHS Skate Direct.

== Career ==
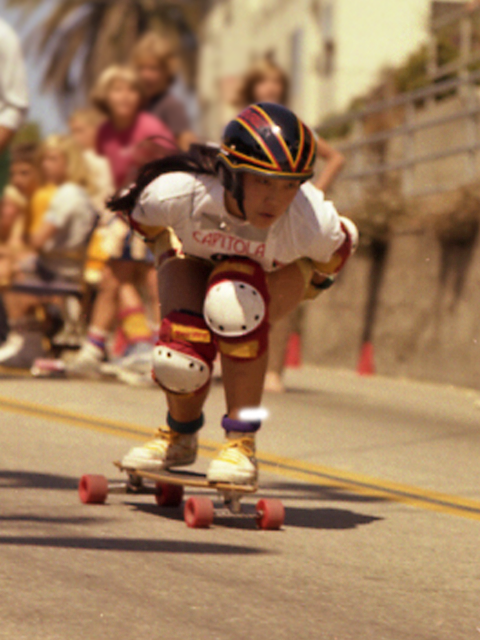
Oyama in 1980

Oyama began skating professionally in the mid-1970s at age 16, competing mainly in men's skateboarding contests, as women's categories had not yet been established in the sport. As the only female competitor in the 1977 Capitola Classic she placed eighth, and in 1978 became a member of the Santa Cruz Skate team. She is one of few Asian-American women professional skateboarders and was a pioneer of Vert skateboarding and vert pool skateboarding for women. Oyama was sponsored by Santa Cruz Skateboards and garnered additional sponsorships by brands managed under the NHS, Inc. umbrella, including Independent Trucks, OJ Wheels, Park Riders, and Cellblock.

In 2003, Oyama won the Slalom World Championships at age 43, and was ranked second in the US and first in the masters division overall in 2013.

In 2015, she became the first woman to win the N-Men Icon Award. In 2018, she was inducted into the Skateboarding Hall of Fame.

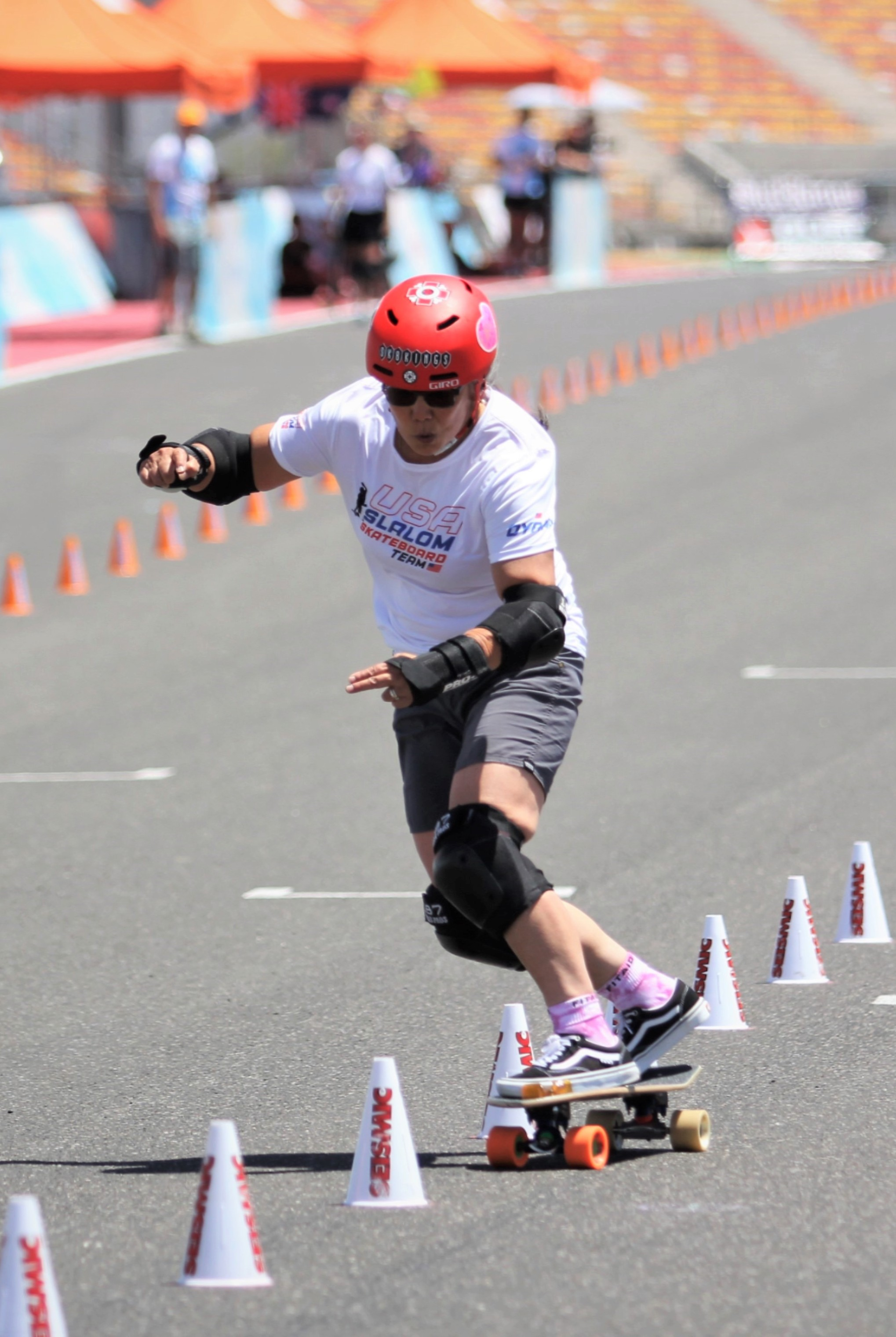
Oyama in 2022

She was featured in the 2023 documentary N-Men: The Untold Story, a film about the global impact of skateboarders from Northern California in the 1970s (starring Tony Hawk and produced by Josh Brolin).

Oyama is featured in the book Game Changers: The Unsung Heroines of Sports History. Her skating helmet from 1979 and first-place trophy from the 4th Berkeley Contest are held in the collection of the Smithsonian's National Museum of American History.

In 2023, she qualified for the World Skate Games in Rome in 2024, where she was a member of the U.S. slalom team as well as qualifying in 2024 for the USA National Slalom Team to compete in the World Skate Games in Rome in September, 2024. In that same year Oyama was listed in the Guinness World Records as the oldest female competitive skateboarder at 64 years and 326 days old. In 2025, she received the "Award For Excellence" from the Japanese American National Museum.

Oyama is the former vice president and one of the founders of the 501(c)(3) nonprofit Board Rescue.

=== Graphic design and illustration ===
Oyama began her career in graphic design in the 1970s, silk screening skateboards at Santa Cruz Skateboards, airbrushing surfboards at Santa Cruz Surf Shop, and creating Thrasher skate ads and clothing designs for Hurley. In 2007, she designed the wave mural for the Wormhoudt Skatepark in Santa Cruz, California.

Oyama is the former Art Director at Giro.

== Competition results ==
| Year | Competition | Category | Result |
|---|---|---|---|
| 1980 | Capitola Classic Professional Downhill Skateboard Competition | Women's Downhill | Won (2nd place) |
| 2002 | FCR World Championship | Open Women's Slalom | Won (2nd place) |
| 2003 | Colorado High Plains Drifter Race | Giant Slalom and Tight Slalom | Won (1st place) |
| 2003 | Bahne/Cadillac SlalomCross | Women's Pro Slalom | Won (1st place) |
| 2022 | World Skate Games, Argentina | Hybrid Slalom | Won (3rd place) |
| 2023 | U.S. National Championship | U.S. Slalom | Won (2nd place) |
| 2023 | ISSA Women's PRO Banked Slalom Skateboarding Championship | Women's Pro - All Runs | Won (4th place) |
| 2025 | International Slalom Skateboarding World Championships | Giant Slalom | Won (3rd place) |
| 2025 | International Slalom Skateboarding World Championships | Women's Overall Ranking | Won (4th place) |
