= John Francis Humphrey =

American businessman (1919–2012)

- Born: October 10, 1919; Waterbury, Connecticut
- Died: April 15, 2012 (aged 92); San Diego, California
- Citizenship: United States
- Occupations: Skateboard designer navy pilot
- Years active: 1963-2012
- Known for: First licensee of a skateboard patent
- Awards: Distinguished Flying Cross; Inducted into the Skateboarding Hall of Fame (2012)

John Francis Humphrey (October 10, 1919 – April 15, 2012) was an American businessman and World War II pilot.

== Early life ==
Humphrey was born October 10, 1919 in Waterbury, Connecticut, and enlisted as a naval aviator in 1941.

In 1944, he was awarded the U.S. Navy’s Distinguished Flying Cross after shooting down a Japanese plane whilst piloting a B-24.

== Skateboarding ==
In 1963, he became the first licensee of a skateboard patent. He joined inventor Albert C. Boydon, whom had previously patented the Child’s Coaster, and the pair began marketing the Humco Surfer.

In 2012 he was inducted into the Skateboarding Hall of Fame.

He died April 15, 2012, in San Diego, California.
