= Lynn Kramer =

American skateboarder and snowboarder

- Born: 1968; 57–58 years old San Diego, California, U.S.
- Education: University of California San Diego
- Occupations: skateboarder, mechanical engineer
- Known for: 17× world champion in slalom racing
- Awards: USA Skateboarding Slalom Hall of Fame (2023); SHoF Skateboarding Hall of Fame (2024)
- Website: Lynn Kramer

Lynn Kramer (born 1968) is an American skateboarder and snowboarder. She has been crowned 17 times as the world champion in slalom racing. Kramer was inducted into the USA Skateboarding Slalom Hall of Fame in 2023, and the SHoF Skateboarding Hall of Fame in 2024.

== Biography ==
Kramer is from San Diego, California. As a child, she was not permitted to skateboard, because her father was an orthopedist. She attended the University of California at San Diego. She is a mechanical engineer.

Kramer started skating in 1985. She suffered torn ACLs in 1988 and 1992, and quit from 1992 to 2000 as she focused on snowboarding and surfing.

She has been crowned 17 times as the world champion in slalom racing. Kramer was inducted into the USA Skateboarding Slalom Hall of Fame in 2023, and the SHoF Skateboarding Hall of Fame in 2024.

She ran the Women's Skateboard Network from 1988 to 1990, and published the zine Girls Who Grind, later known as Equal Time. She also coaches and teaches the sport of slalom racing to youth, and works as an engineer supporting manufacturers of skateboards and surfboards.
