= Saecha Clarke =

Skateboarder

Saecha Clarke (born 1975) is a former professional skateboarder from Huntington Beach, California. Clarke is recognized as a trailblazer in women's skateboarding.

== Skateboarding career ==
In 1990, at the age of 15, Clarke was sponsored by Venture, World Industries, Vans, and arise. She appeared, boardsliding a rail, in Tony Hawk's Beyond column in Transworld Skateboarding, in the March 1991 issue.

== Honors ==
In 2023, Clarke was inducted into the Skateboarding Hall of Fame.
