= Russ Howell =

American skateboarder

Personal information
- Full name: Russell Wayne Howell
- Nationality: American
- Born: Winston-Salem, North Carolina, United States
- Education: Physical education, California State University, Long Beach
- Height: 5 ft 3 in (160 cm)

Sport
- Sport: Skateboarding
- Updated on 7 October 2021

Russell Wayne Howell (born September 1949) is a professional skateboarder. While working towards his degree in physical education, Howell competed and won many freestyle skateboarding competitions throughout his skating career.

== Life and career ==
Howell was born in September 1949 in Winston-Salem, North Carolina, but moved with his family to Long Beach, California when he was nine months old. Howell first began skateboarding at the age of 9 in 1958. At the age of 19, Howell entered the United States Air Force, where his roommate got him interested in skiing. After his service, he received a two-year degree in mathematics from a junior college. From there, Howell studied physical education at California State University, Long Beach, eventually earning a Bachelor's degree in 1979.

While working and going to school full-time, Howell began teaching people how to skateboard for free. Encouraged by his students to try competing in a skate contest, he enrolled as a competitor in the 1975 Dyno Championships in Huntington Beach Mall. Howell ended up placing first in the men's freestyle event, and was deemed the second-best overall skater. This was the first in a string of freestyle contest wins for Howell. Most notably, he won the senior men's freestyle event at the 1975 Bahne/Cadillac National Skateboard Championships in Del Mar, California, the same competition that helped propel the Z-Boys to notoriety.

Russ set a Guinness World record for longest handstand on a skateboard (2 minutes). In 1979, he set an unofficial record by performing 163 consecutive 360-degree spins on his skateboard. Russ is the first professional skateboarder and opened up the sport to professionalism. He served on many organizational boards in an effort to elevate the sport. He also worked in the Long Beach Unified School District as a substitute teacher. He is a member of the Thrasher Hall of Fame. He currently skates for Decomposed Skateboards.

During the 1970s, Russ Howell built his own wheels (Howell Freestyle Wheels) for his freestyle boards. In 1975, he was sponsored by Grentec, whose plastic skateboards he promoted. However, Howell became disillusioned with Grentec; according to him, the company did not pay him, and the boards he received felt cheap. In 1992, Howell moved to Boise, Idaho.

== Legacy ==
Howell is regarded as one of the earliest professional freestyle skateboarders who wanted to help skateboarding gain legitimacy as a sport. Stacy Peralta of the Z-Boys recalled that Howell "might have been one of the only skaters to get paid at the time" in 1975. An issue of Skateboarder magazine that same year described him as "a model competitor", and that he "has done more than anyone to promote the credibility of skateboarding by taking it into the dance-art form stage." Regarding his beliefs, Howell said, "I was a physical-education major, and I wanted to help integrate skateboarding into public school athletics and into a place where the International Olympic Committee would consider it a sport."
