= Jody Gooding =

British beach volleyball player

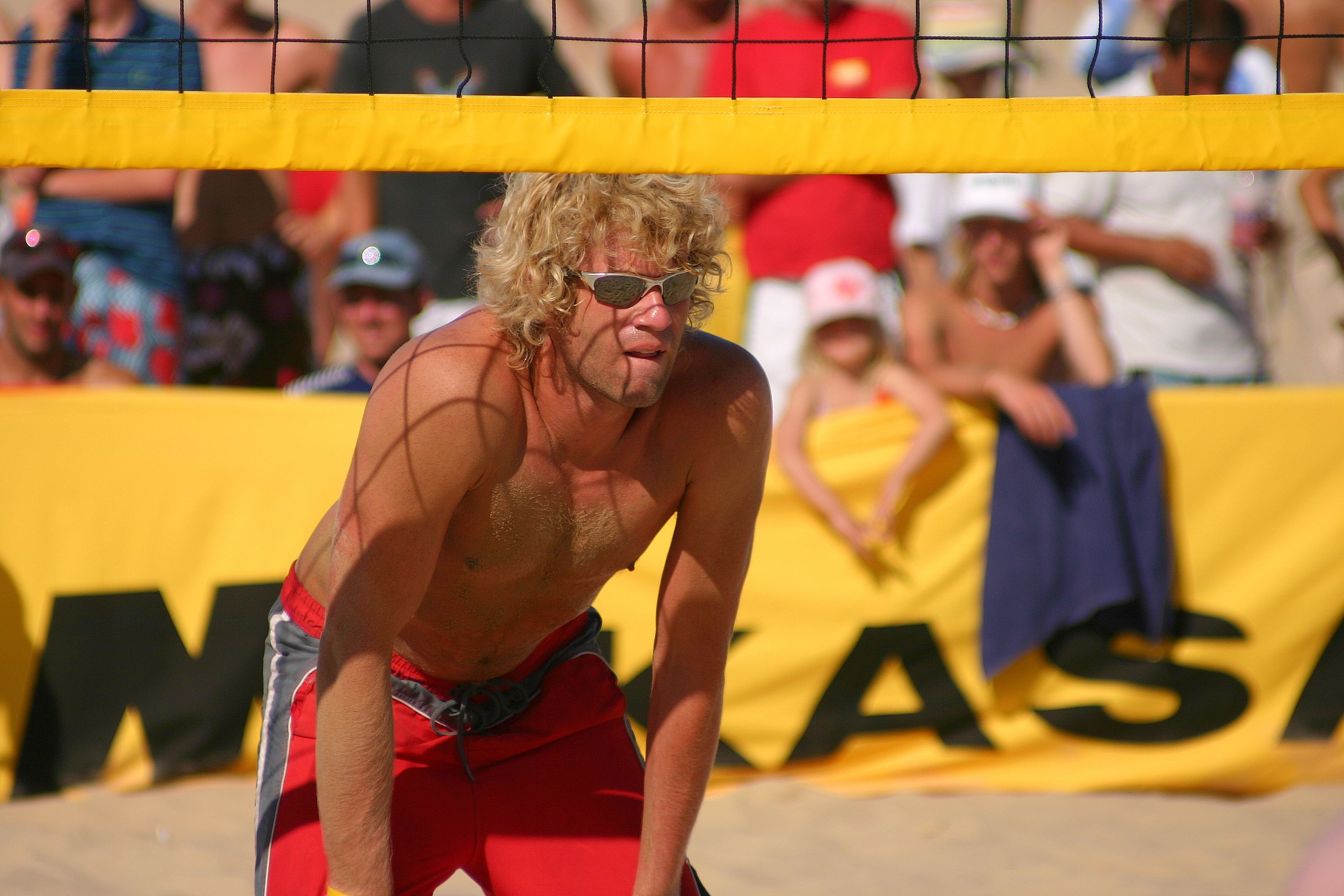
Jody Gooding, Sandbanks Classic

Jody Gooding is an ex-beach volleyball player for England and Great Britain who was the youngest-ever British champion.

== Early life ==
He was born in Gloucester. He attended school in Tuffley at St Peter's High School, Gloucester and Hartpury College in Gloucestershire.

== Career ==
The youngest British Champion.

Previously based in Hermosa Beach, California, he competed on the world tour from 2007.

He won the men's championship with Paul Godwin at Weymouth in 2001 despite having a broken toe and whiplash injuries, and was named player of the tournament. He won again in 2003 with Clayton Lucas.

Training on Sandbanks Beach, Dorset, he won the Sandbanks Classic with Greg Weaver in 2004/2005. He completed a hat-trick the following year with M Bowes. He won the Volleyball England Beach Championship at Brighton in 2007 with Steve Grotowski.

In 2009, Gooding relocated to the UK beach volleyball HQ at TeamBath, part of the University of Bath. His team partner is Steve Grotowski, with whom he played at the FIVB World Series in Shanghai, China in 2009. He has played on the FIVB World Tour since 2007. He was the youngest-ever British champion. He has won over 35 British Tour events. Jody currently has the highest finishes for a male athlete from Great Britain on the international stage a 13th place on the World Tour ad 9th Place on the European Tour.

2011 was a prominent year for Jody after getting a career high of 13th on the World Tour and beating all is other United Kingdoms rivals, he has put himself in Pole position for qualification to the 2012 Olympics with seven tournaments remaining,

Gooding appeared on Match of the Day with members of the Manchester United team to launch a government sport initiative.

It was announced on 22 November 2011 that Nutrition company NutritionX would be sponsoring and Supporting Jody in his push for a place at the London 2012 Olympics.

== Personal life ==
Gooding lives in a 175-year-old cottage in Midsomer Norton, Somerset with his wife, fellow beach volleyball player Denise Johns. They were married on 4 September 2011 in a ceremony held on the beach in Folly Beach, South Carolina. He is a father to 3 children; Forde Francis Gooding, Taylor Gooding, and Blake Gooding.
