= Torger Johnson =

American skateboarder (1951 – 1983)

- Born: 1951; United States
- Died: 1983 (aged 31–32); Hawaii
- Citizenship: United States
- Occupation: Skateboarder
- Years active: 1960s-1983
- Known for: Early skateboarding pioneer; founder of Makaha team
- Awards: Inducted into the Skateboarding Hall of Fame (2010)

Torger Johnson (1951 – 1983) was an American skateboarder and surfer.

== Life and career ==
Johnson was born in 1951. He was considered to be one of the early pioneers, and participated in the first International Skateboard Championships in 1965, in Anaheim, California.

He established the Makaha team in 1963. He was also a member of the Hobie Super Surfer team.

He died in a car accident in Maui, Hawaii in 1983.

In 2019, he was posthumously inducted into the Skateboarding Hall of Fame.
