= Bruce Logan (skateboarder) =

American skateboarder (born 1951)

- Born: June 13, 1951 (age 74); United States
- Citizenship: United States
- Occupation: Skateboarder
- Years active: 1950s-present
- Known for: Early skateboarding pioneer; founder of Makaha team
- Notable work: Skateboard (1978)
- Awards: Inducted into the Skateboarding Hall of Fame (2009)

Bruce Logan (born June 13, 1951) is an American skateboarder.

== Life and career ==
Logan was born June 13, 1951. He began skateboarding in the 1950s, with a board constructed out of a 2x4 with roller skate wheels.

He established the Makaha team in 1963.

In 1978, he was part of the cast of skateboarders in Skateboard (1978).

In 2009, he was part of the inaugural group of inductees into the Skateboarding Hall of Fame, alongside Tony Hawk, Danny Way, and Tony Alva.
