= Frank Nasworthy =

American skateboarder

Frank Nasworthy is notable in the history of skateboarding for introducing polyurethane wheel technology to the sport in the early 1970s.

After graduating from Annandale High School in Northern Virginia in 1967, Nasworthy attended Virginia Tech for a year. Back with his family for the summer of 1970, he visited a plastics factory in Purcellville called Creative Urethanes, owned by a friend’s father. The factory had experimented with a polyurethane roller skate wheel that was sold to Roller Sports Inc., which supplied wheels for rental skates at roller rinks. The rationale was that a softer wheel with improved grip would help novice roller skaters, but the wheel was largely rejected by roller skaters who favored the hard steel wheels that allowed for faster speeds on the wooden floors of the roller rinks.

Up to this point, skateboards had also been manufactured with either the same steel wheels as rollerskates, or out of a clay composite – a combination of plastic, paper, and finely ground walnut shells. These wheels wore out far too quickly, in as little as seven or eight hours.

Nasworthy moved to Southern California in 1971 to surf and noticed that kids were trying to skateboard when the surf was down. He thought the soft polyurethane wheels would be ideal for skateboards, and had his father send him 10 sets. Assembling them onto his skateboard, he discovered they allowed for a much smoother ride that was fast and controllable. Having realized the potential of a polyurethane skateboard wheel, Nasworthy invested $500, which he had accumulated working in a restaurant, and formed the Cadillac Wheels Company (on account of their smooth ride). Creative Urethane made the wheels to his specifications and Nasworthy took his company to California in 1972.

Due to the infancy of skateboarding at this time, Nasworthy sold his wheels directly to surf shops along the coast of California, and placed some tentative advertisements featuring a young Gregg Weaver in surfing magazines. News of the wheels initially spread by word of mouth, but the cumulative effect was a reawakening of skateboarding to the extent that, by 1975, scores of manufacturers had entered the market, a national magazine, Skateboarder, had re-formed, and Nasworthy was selling 300,000 sets of wheels per year.

Nasworthy decided to license his wheels to Bahne and Co. of Encinitas, California and Bahne skateboards were packaged with Cadillac wheels. During 1975, the company reported sales of 10–20,000 skateboards per month. Nasworthy's association with Bahne led him to commission a series of paintings by poster artist Jim Evans that featured Cadillac Wheels. The posters, with titles like, "From Out of the West" and "Accept No Substitutes" came to represent the paradigm shift taking place in skateboarding.

This success did not last long, as Nasworthy’s innovation was soon overtaken by the introduction of a precision bearing skateboard wheel, the Road Rider. But Nasworthy’s discovery was the catalyst for the second skateboard boom. As a professional freestyle competitor at the time noted:

The progress of the urethane [sic] wheels just totally stoked me; you could do so much more on a skateboard, surf moves, especially; you could carve your turns and stuff without sliding, that changed everything a lot.

Nasworthy completed a Bachelor of Science degree in Applied Mechanics at University of California San Diego in 1984. After earning his degree, he pursued a career as a mechanical engineer. Most of his career was spent at Hewlett Packard where he helped to develop the first wide format Thermal Inkjet Printer and filed patents regarding paper handling. Nasworthy continued inventing and creating at D&K Engineering from 2011 to 2015, and Simplexity Product Development from 2015 until his retirement in 2017.
