= Grass surfing =

Grass surfing (or hill surfing) is a form of skateboarding. Grass surfers take the trucks off an old skateboard and find a mildly steep hill made up of dry grass, sand, moss, dirt or other surface that could be used to gain speed and control.

It is similar to grassboarding, a boarding sport born in the early 90s in Costa Rica.

== Risks ==
Because this is done downhill on dry grass, dirt, etc. there is a significant lack of control.

A potential risk is of hitting a buried rock. This could cause the board to come to a sudden deceleration, causing the surfer to fall off the board, possibly resulting in injury.

== Parts ==
Most boards are just skateboard decks that are modified by taking the trucks and hardware off and in some cases covering the bottom in duct tape or polyurethane.

In other cases, actual surf boards have been used with varying results on steeper smooth surfaces such as sand. The pointed uncurved tip of these boards usually results in a leaping stop when the tip embeds itself at the base of the incline, and progression down the incline requires frequent shimmying.

== Methods ==
The most popular method in grass surfing is to find an old skateboard deck and remove the trucks and other hardware. Next find a mildly steep hill of dry grass, gravel, dirt, sand, etc. While standing on the skateboard deck in a crouched position at the top of the hill, push yourself and gain speed, gradually assuming a more natural standing position.

== Modifications ==
Some people cover the bottom of the boards in a sealant (usually polyurethane), while some may add furniture wax to the bottom of the board (such as the brand Pledge, or something similar). Also, some people build homemade boards out of used items such as sleds, cardboard, etc.
