= Matt Warshaw =

American surfer and writer

- Born: 1960 (age 65–66); Los Angeles, California, U.S.
- Occupations: Surfer; Writer
- Children: 1

Matt Warshaw (born 1960) is a former professional surfer, former writer and editor at Surfer magazine (1984–1990), and the author of dozens of feature articles and large-format books on surfing culture and history.

Warshaw currently curates the online Encyclopedia of Surfing and History of Surfing, each website based on expanded material from the archives assembled for their print companions. He has 1 child.

== Background ==
Born in Los Angeles and raised in Venice Beach and Manhattan Beach, at his competitive peak Warshaw was the second-ranked amateur in California and 43rd-ranked professional on the International Professional Surfers world tour (1982). After working as a student at several Southern California community colleges and San Diego State University while still a competitive surfer, Warshaw earned a B.A. in history from the University of California, Berkeley (1992). After finishing his degree at Berkeley, Warshaw briefly aspired to a career in academia, enrolling in the graduate program in History at UCLA. He quit after three weeks.

Warshaw is noted for saying "All I knew when I quit [graduate school at UCLA] was that I was going to make a living writing about surfing, and as a matter of vanity, I wanted to be the world's authority on it." Today he is widely recognized as one of the world's foremost historians of surfing, living up to a 2005 feature on his work that named him "the caretaker of surfing history."

1969 marks the year that Warshaw began surfing in Southern California along with friend and future skateboarding icon Jay Adams. Three years later in 1972, a twelve-year-old Warshaw accidentally became the owner of the very first surfboard made under Jeff Ho's Zephyr Productions brand.

As Warshaw recounts, he had been surfing a custom Jeff Ho swallowtail for about six months before the board was stolen from the car park at Leo Carrillo State Beach. Devastated, the young surfer scraped together money from odd jobs to order another board from Ho a few months later. When he received the new board from shop manager Skip Engblom, Warshaw noticed that the shaper's name had been replaced with a single airbrushed word, Zephyr. Sensing Warshaw's surprise, Engblom explained that Zephyr was a new label launched by Ho's shop. Warshaw had unintentionally become the owner of the very first Zephyr artifact of any kind, well before Ho's new surfboard label and its homonymous skateboarding brand had gained fame through the Zephyr Competition Team, or Z-Boys.

Warshaw was later one of the first Zephyr surf team riders. As a Z-Boy, Warshaw outgrew his pre-teen moniker, "Wimpy," although his clean-cut image stood in striking contrast to the rebel personalities (Jay Adams, Tony Alva, etc.) that would accompany the Zephyr skateboard brand in later years.

== Career ==
Warshaw began writing for surf-related publications in Southern California in the 1980s. After becoming a writer for Surfer magazine in 1984, Warshaw became the publication's editor in 1990. Shortly thereafter, he left the monthly magazine, a decision which he described as "[doing] them a big favor by leaving; they just didn't know it at the time," citing his dislike of crunching numbers for advertising revenue. His subsequent relocation to San Francisco was partially motivated by the overcrowding of surfing beaches in Southern California and a desire for a change of scenery in the wake of surfing's evolution into a popular pastime devoid of community ties. He lived, surfed, and wrote in San Francisco for over two decades. His work has since appeared in The New York Times, The Wall Street Journal, The Los Angeles Times, Esquire, Outside, and The Surfer's Journal, among others. He is regularly consulted for online content for prominent surfing media outlets, including BeachGrit, Surfer, Surfline, and STAB.

Among other titles, Warshaw authored The History of Surfing (San Francisco: Chronicle Books, 2010) and The Encyclopedia of Surfing (Orlando: Harcourt, 2003. 2nd ed. 2005). The latter book has since been converted into a regularly-updated website featuring many of the print book's original entries, a blog, archival video and audio content, and feature content by notable surf personalities. Described as the "synthesis of a museum, an archive, and even a theater" at its launch, Warshaw describes the online portal as "a conservation project. [...] a digital place where the sport can be presented, stored, celebrated, archived, and accessed." Originally planned to be a feature for Surfline.com, the Encyclopedia of Surfing was sponsored by Surfer magazine. However, Surfer magazine dropped its sponsorship. In 2017, rather than shut the site down, Warshaw started a fundraiser to support the Encyclopedia of Surfing. He successfully raised the funds necessary to keep Encyclopedia of Surfing running.

His 2003 work, Mavericks: The Story of Big-Wave Surfing, sold over 35,000 copies and was released in a second edition in 2005.

Longtime The New Yorker staff writer and 2016 Pulitzer prize winner in the «Biography and Memoir» category William Finnegan wrote the foreword to the 2005 print edition of The Encyclopedia of Surfing. Chapter Eight of Finnegan's Pulitzer-winning Barbarian Days discusses a specific stretch of Northern California beach that he and Warshaw both frequented at different points in their lives, before the area was hopelessly crowded. Journalists such as STAB magazine co-founder Derek Rielly regularly praises Warshaw in print.

Warshaw has mentored numerous young journalists, placing writers on the Surfer editorial staff and connecting independent authors with editors and surfing personalities for their investigative work. He is known for his generosity with information and willingness to share research material with university researchers and academics and his work is regularly cited and acknowledged by international scholars publishing about surfing. Also a bibliophile and collector, Warshaw is reputed to hold one of the largest private archives of surf-related publications, media, and memorabilia in the world.

In spite of his renown, Warshaw has publicly and humorously decried the difficulty of earning a living through writing about surfing. He once remarked, "I've written strictly about surfing because I feel the most secure when I know that I've got the most information available on a subject. That's what allows me to write with confidence. I don't call it important, but I do realize that I'm doing it, and nobody else is, and that's gratifying. I invented a nice, low-paying career for myself (laughter)."

== Oxford English Dictionary involvement ==
In early 2016, Warshaw was contacted by Joshua Pendragon, a Manchester, UK-based Oxford English Dictionary Library Researcher and consultant, to help verify the first uses for the terms "longboard" and "longboarder." After finding Drew Kampion's use of the term "long board" in a September 1968 (vol. 9, no. 4) SURFER article ("The Super Short, Uptight, V-Bottom, Tube Carving Plastic Machines, and other assorted short subjects"), Warshaw was enlisted to document the first uses for entries including "tandem surfing" and "tandem surfboard." He quickly located "tandem surfing" in Tom Blake's Hawaiian Surfriders, 1935 and was invited to become an external consultant to the OED editors.

Later that year, Senior Editor of the Oxford English Dictionary, David Martin, contacted Warshaw about providing additional source citations for the earliest published usage of a large body of surfing terms, including "barrel," "reef rash," "board sock," "grom," "close out," "dawn patrol," "doggy door," "green room," "shaper," and "swallowtail." As a formal consultant to the OED, Warshaw continues to contribute to the authority's surf lexicon with quotation evidence for numerous surf-specific terms.

Referencing his family's academic pedigree, Warshaw said his consultancy for the OED is his accomplishment that has "most impressed his parents."

== Bibliography (select) ==
- Surfriders: In Search of the Perfect Wave Warshaw (ed.) (Harper Books, 1997).
- Above the Roar: 50 Surfer Interviews (Watersports Books, 1997). Foreword by Shaun Thomson.
- Mavericks: The Story of Big-Wave Surfing (San Francisco: Chronicle Books, 2000; 2nd ed. 2003). Introduction to 2nd edition by Daniel Duane.
- Zero Break: An Illustrated Collection of Surf Writing, 1777-2004 (Orlando: Harcourt Books, 2004).
- The Encyclopedia of Surfing (Orlando: Harcourt Books, 2003; 2nd ed. 2005). Introduction to 2nd edition by William Finnegan.
- Surf Movie Tonite! Surf Movie Poster Art, 1957-2005 (San Francisco: Chronicle Books, 2005).
- Photo/Stoner (San Francisco: Chronicle Books, 2006).
- The History of Surfing (San Francisco: Chronicle Books, 2010).
- A Brief History of Surfing (San Francisco: Chronicle Books, 2017)

== Additional information ==
In 2012, Warshaw was inducted into the Hall of Fame at his high school alma mater, Mira Costa High School, in Manhattan Beach, California. A graduate of the Class of 1978, Warshaw joined surfing icon Dewey Weber (Class of 1956) and punk rock musician Jim Lindberg (Class of 1983), among other prominent MCHS alumni recognized for their achievements in national and international politics, business, science, entertainment, and sports. Warshaw was a classmate of Lance Dixon (Class of 1978), presently a distinguished Professor at Stanford University's SLAC National Accelerator Laboratory. It is rumored that more people have read Warshaw's work than Dixon's.
