= John Severson =

American surfer and artist (1933–2017)

- Born: John Hughett Severson, Jr. December 2, 1933
- Died: December 18, 2017 (aged 84); Maui, Hawaii
- Education: Long Beach State, Art Education
- Known for: Founder and editor, Surfer magazine; Founder, Wind Surf magazine; author, Modern surfing around the world (1964); author, Surf (2014); artist
- Spouse: Louise Stier Severson
- Children: Jenna Severson; Anna Severson

John Severson (SEA-ver-son, 1933–2017) was an American editor, author, filmmaker and artist, widely known as the founder of Surfer, a magazine focused on the sport and culture of surfing. Severson also created a diverse body of artwork dedicated to the sport.

Severson won the 1961 Peru International Surf Contest. In 1991, he was inducted into the International Surfing Hall of Fame. In 2011, he won the Surfer Poll Lifetime Achievement Award. His artwork and photography have been published globally, in Surfer, Sports Illustrated, L'Equipe, The New York Times, The Guardian, BBC, 032c, and Nowness. In 2008, Fender released two special edition guitars featuring Severson's artwork, the Surf Fever and Woody.

Drew Kampion, editor of Surfer 1968-1972, said Severson was "the first to treat surfing as a worthy subject matter for fine art." Sam George, editor of Surfer (1999) said "before John Severson, there was no 'surf media,' no 'surf industry' and no 'surf culture' — at least not in the way we understand it today."

The New York Times called Severson "a pioneer of modern surf culture;" who created "the surf art genre; joined the earliest ranks of surf filmmakers; developed the "Surf Fever" writing font now synonymous with surfing; and started the first major magazine dedicated to wave riding, Surfer, a holy book of the sport.

== Background ==
"In this crowded world
the surfer can still seek and
find the perfect day,
the perfect wave,
and be alone
with the surf
and his thoughts."

— John Severson
the first issue of Surfer

Severson was born December 12, 1933, in Los Angeles, California, the son of Hugh and Dorothy Severson. He grew up in North Fair Oaks and Pasadena until his family moved when he was thirteen (1945, variously reported as 1943) to San Clemente — where his father operated a PDQ gas station at El Camino Real and Avenida Aragon.

In 1949, Severson's father built a gift shop at the street in front of their home where his mother sold California souvenirs and leather items. Located on the Pacific Coast Highway, they added orange juice sales when it became popular with the tourists. Severson, his sister and three brothers each worked creating leathergoods, marketing them to tourists and turning the shop into a restaurant when Interstate 5 arrived nearby. His mother cooked and was widely known for her homemade pies.

In San Clemente, Severson learned to surf — also painting, photographing and filming the sport. Following the advice of a mentor, he documented his surfing experience "with his Brownie camera, then with cartoons, woodblock prints, and paintings." When shooting in the ocean, he used a plastic bag to keep his camera dry. He also played trumpet, formed a barbershop quartet, and pitched for his baseball team.

First studying art at Orange Coast College, he received a B.A. in art education at Chico State College and M.A. in Art Education at Long Beach State. After graduating in 1956 he taught high school art, including ceramics, for one semester before being drafted into the Army. In Oahu, he served as a draftsman and mapmaker, was a member of the Army surf team and sold his sketches to tourists. There he made his first film, Surf. He subsequently made the films Surf Safari (1959), Big Wednesday (1961), Going My Wave (1962), Surf Fever, The Angry Sea (1963), Surf Classics (1964), and Pacific Vibrations (1970).

At first a one-man production, Severson developed Surfer magazine into a vital sport periodical and cultural institution. He eloped in 1959 with U.C. Berkeley graduate, Louise Stier. By 1966, Louise and he and their two daughters were featured in photo essay in Life magazine. Ultimately, with the success of Surfer by the late 1960s he was married, had two daughters, lived in a beachfront gated community (10 minutes from where he had grown up, purchasing an oceanfront property adjacent to what would become the Nixon compound), played golf, drove a Mercedes, and "spent less and less time in the water." By this time, he had received the nickname, "Sevo."

In 1969 when Richard Nixon moved next door to his home near San Clemente's Cotton's Point, Marines prohibited surfing at Cotton's Point and Trestles, two noted surf spots. Severson contracted with Life magazine to take telephoto images of Nixon and his family on the beach, so Nixon had a six-foot privacy wall built around his property.

In the early 1970s, Severson sold Surfer and moved with his family to Maui. In Hawaii, he surfed, painted, and designed an extensive line of Hawaiian surf shirts for the Kahala brand. Severson windsurfed — ultimately launching, publishing and editing Wind Surf magazine, contributing art and photos. For a year, he regularly traveled the Pacific with his family, living for months in Tahiti in a treehouse.

Severson authored books including Surfer Cartoons: the best of SURFER cartoons plus great new cartoons, John Severson Publications, 1963; Modern Surfing Around The World, Doubleday, 1964; Great Surfing, Doubleday, 1967; Surfing Modern Arts, Surf Art Festival Editions, 2007; Surf Fever: Surfer Photography, Journal Concepts, 2004; and Surf, Damiani Publishing/Puka Puka Gallery, 2014.

Describing the act of surfing to the culture magazine, 032c, Severson said:

It's like a beautiful sensation of dance with the added dimension of being in nature. There's this whole force of moving water, and as you ride, you harness this water. Then, as your abilities increase, you can go farther and deeper into the wave, and into more radical positions – like off the top, off the bottom – and there are these weightless sensations. It's another dimension.

In 2017, he contracted a virulent form of leukemia and died at his home near Lahaina, on Honokeana Cove, in Maui, Hawaii on May 26, 2017, survived by his wife Louise Stier Severson (born 1940); daughters Anna Severson (born 1965) and Jenna Severson de Rosnay (born 1963); and brother Joel 'Joe' Lee Severson (born 1944). He was pre-deceased by his father John 'Hugh' Hughett Severson (1905–1994); his mother Dorothy May Severson (1906–1983, née Flachman); two of his three brothers James Russell Severson (1936–2009) and Jerry Frank Severson (1935–2009); and sister Jane Gertrude Severson Wing (1931–1993).

== Surfer ==
In 1960, Severson produced a booklet for his film screenings, giving it a landscape format and calling it The Surfer. He imagined he would produce another to promote his next film, but his first edition proved popular and profitable. It was briefly called The Surfer Quarterly, printed in portrait format. In 1962, the booklet became Surfer, which remains in print. Noted surf historian Matt Warshaw described it "the rough little 36-page booklet that started off as a promo piece for his 1960 movie Surf Fever, and was later grandfathered in as the debut issue of Surfer magazine."

Severson was inspired to create Surfer, specifically to counter the depiction of the sport and surf culture in the 1959 film Gidget. In his 2014 book John Severson Surf, he wrote "surfers hated those Hollywood surf films, and I could see that Surfer could create a truer image of the sport." Severson's photography, art and humor set the tone for the future of Surfer, which quickly grew to reflect the sport and the culture, as well as become a voice for surfers and environmental activism.

Severson used $3000 to print the initial copies for $1.00 each, selling them for $2.00 each. He and his brother delivered them to surf shops, where they immediately sold. For free, Severson would produce advertising artwork for prospective advertisers, soon employing a staff, notably photographer Ron Stoner, cartoonist Rick Griffin, Pat McNoley and writers Bev Morgan, Drew Kampion and Steve Pezman — and later Matt Warshaw. Severn's painting of two surfers on the beach appeared on Surfer's cover and was named the best cover illustrations of 1963 by Communication Arts magazine. Toward the end of the 1960s, Severson led the magazine in a less predictable direction, more sympathetic with the counterculture movement, introducing poetry and long form essays.

The magazine opened the sport so surfers could learn what was happening in their sport locally and globally, including new places to surf, ways to ride, and new personalities shaping the sport. Within only a few years, competitors included Surf Guide, Surfing, and Australian Surfer, which copied Surfer's layout so heavily, Severson considered outright plagiarism. He remained editor of the magazine until 1968.

Severson sold Surfer, the date reported variously as 1970; alternately as 1971, directly to Steve Pezman; and also alternately as "the late 1960s" to For Better Living, an Auburn, California-based company founded by F.G. 'Bud' Fabian. Bud Fabian had retired from For Better Living in 1996, a company whose primary business was precast concrete. At the time, the magazine was produced by Surfer Publications, a subsidiary of For Better Living and by the late 1990s, was based in San Juan Capistrano.

Drew Kampion was editor of the magazine from 1968 to 1972 and noted writer and surf historian Matt Warshaw, became a writer for Surfer, beginning in 1984, becoming the publication's editor in 1990.

The magazine changed ownership and management numerous times over its history and is currently (2020) published by American Media (AMI), owner of the National Enquirer. By the time of Severson's passing in 2017, Surfer was reduced to eight issues annually, and Surfing magazine and Surfer's Path as well as many other international surf magazines had folded.

== Honors and awards ==
- Surfing Hall of Fame, 1993
- Surfing Walk of Fame, Huntington Beach, 1995
- Lifetime Achievement Award "Waterman of the Year," Surf Industry Manufacturers Association, 1997
- John Severson Statue by William Limebrook, Watermen's Plaza, Dana Point, 2019. The statue was the fourth of ten life-size cast bronze statues by William Limebrook of famous surfers and watersport athletes, filmmakers, artists, and entrepreneurs at Watermen's Plaza.
