= William Finnegan =

American journalist

William Finnegan is a staff writer at The New Yorker and the author of works of international journalism. He has specially addressed issues of racism and conflict in Southern Africa and politics in Mexico and South America, as well as poverty among youth in the United States, and is well known for his writing on surfing.

== Early years ==
Finnegan was born in New York City, the eldest of four children to Patricia and Bill Finnegan, a television and film producer whose well known credits included Hawaii Five-O and The Fabulous Baker Boys. Bill Finnegan worked on a number of television productions shot on location in Hawaii. William and his siblings were raised in Los Angeles and Hawaii. During his youth he took up surfing, which became a lifelong passion. In fact, he still practices off Long Island when at home.

William is a graduate of William Howard Taft High School in Woodland Hills, California and received his B.A. from the University of California, Santa Cruz in 1974 with a degree in Literature. Finnegan spent the next four years taking seasonal jobs and working on an MFA degree in creative writing at the University of Montana.

After obtaining his graduate degree Finnegan spent four years abroad, traveling in Asia, Australia, and Africa. He supported himself with freelance travel writing and other odd jobs. Upon reaching Cape Town, South Africa, he took a position as an English teacher at Grassy Park High School, a school for "coloured" students. Finnegan's teaching experience coincided with a nationwide school boycott, giving him fodder for his first book, Crossing the Line: A Year in the Land of Apartheid, which was published in 1986. It was selected by the New York Times Book Review as one of the ten best nonfiction books of the year.

== Journalism career ==
Finnegan's experience in South Africa transformed him from a novelist to a political journalist. His first short piece, about his experience living in Sri Lanka, was published in Mother Jones in 1979. Finnegan began contributing to The New Yorker in 1984 and has been a staff writer there since 1987. He has also contributed to Harper's and The New York Review of Books, among other publications.

Finnegan contributed a two-part series for the New Yorker in 1992 entitled "Playing Doc's Games". A widely experienced surfer, Finnegan writes about the local surf scene in San Francisco revolving around Ocean Beach and Dr. Mark Renneker ("Doc") as well as Finnegan's own personal experiences. A remarkable piece of writing, it is considered to be one of the best pieces of journalism on surfing.

Finnegan's next two books grew out of assignments for The New Yorker. In 1986, he was sent to Johannesburg, where he followed black reporters who gathered information for white reporters during Apartheid. This led to the 1988 publication of Dateline Soweto: Travels with Black South African Reporters. A Complicated War: The Harrowing of Mozambique, published in 1992, grew out of a series of correspondences about the war-torn nation for the magazine, and Finnegan's own travels throughout that war-torn nation. 1998 saw the publication of Cold New World: Growing Up in a Harder Country, which deals with the bleak lives of American teenagers in spite of the United States’ economic affluence. It was a finalist for the New York Public Library’s Helen Bernstein Book Award for Excellence in Journalism in 1999.

In the July 20, 2009 issue of The New Yorker, Finnegan profiled Sheriff Joe Arpaio of Maricopa County, Arizona and his role in the conflict over immigration in that border state. In the May 31, 2010 issue, he reported from Michoacan state in Mexico on the rise of the "La Familia" drug gang and the increasing social and political instability in Mexico. His "Talk of the Town" comment on "Borderlines," which addresses the U.S. political stalemate over immigration reform, appeared in the magazine's issue for July 26, 2010.

== Awards ==
Finnegan's autobiographical work "Barbarian Days: A Surfing Life" won the 2016 Pulitzer Prize for Biography or Autobiography. Andy Martin, author and surfing columnist, wrote in Literary Review, "Reading this book is like riding in the tube alongside him, looking through a dreamy, luminous telescope that magnifies birth and death, genesis and apocalypse."

Finnegan received the John Bartlow Martin Award for Public Interest Magazine Journalism on two occasions, given by Northwestern University’s Medill School of Journalism, in 1994 and 1996. He was a National Magazine Award finalist on two occasions as well, in 1990 and 1995. In 1994, his article “Deep East Texas” won the Edward M. Brecher Award for Achievement in the Field of Journalism from the Drug Policy Foundation. His article “The Unwanted” won the Sidney Hillman Award for Magazine Reporting in 1998. His report from Sudan, “The Invisible War”, won a Citation for Excellence from the Overseas Press Club in 2000. In 2002, Hunter College, The City University of New York, honored him with the James Aronson Award for Social Justice Journalism for his article "Leasing the Rain" on the fight to control fresh water.

== Bibliography ==
=== Books ===
- Finnegan, William (1984). Crossing the line : a year in the land of apartheid. Persea.
- — (1993). A complicated war : the harrowing of Mozambique. University of California Press.
- — (1995). Dateline Soweto : travels with Black South African reporters. University of California Press.
- — (1998). Cold new world : growing up in a harder country. Random House.
- — (2015). Barbarian Days: A Surfing Life. Penguin.

=== Essays and reporting ===
- Finnegan, William (April 16, 1984). "Comment". The Talk of the Town. The New Yorker. 60 (9): 39.
- — (July 20, 2009). "Sheriff Joe". Profiles. The New Yorker. 85 (24): 42–53.
- — (April 4, 2011). "Hurricane returns". Talk of the Town. Dept. of Justice. The New Yorker. 87 (7): 25.
- — (March 25, 2013). "The miner's daughter: Gina Rinehart is Australia's richest–and most controversial–billionaire". The New Yorker. 89 (6): 76–87.
- — (April 29, 2013). "The deportation machine: a citizen trapped in the system". Annals of Immigration. The New Yorker. 89 (11): 24–29.
- — (June 3, 2013). "Working". The Talk of the Town. Comment. The New Yorker. 89 (16): 17–18.
- — (September 1, 2014). "The man without a mask : how the drag queen Cassandro became a star of Mexican wrestling". The Sporting Scene. The New Yorker. 90 (25): 38–49.
- — (April 20, 2015). "Tears of the sun : the gold rush at the top of the world". Letter from Peru. The New Yorker. 91 (9): 54–65. (Note: Title in the online table of contents is "A fortune at the top of the world".)
- — (February 22, 2016). "Last days : preparing for the apocalypse in San Bernardino". A Reporter at Large. The New Yorker. 92 (2): 50–59. (Note: Title in the online table of contents is "Preparing for apocalypse in San Bernardino".)
- — (May 15, 2017). "A Righteous Case: Taking Down Terrorists in Court". Annals of Law. The New Yorker. 93 (19): 64–75.
- — (September 18, 2017). "Broken Dreams: Is Ending DACA the Worst Decision Trump Has Made?". The Talk of the Town: Comment. The New Yorker. 93 (34): 17–18.
- — (June 3, 2019). "One-man band". The Political Scene. The New Yorker. 95 (15): 32–43. (Note: Online version is entitled "Can Beto bounce back?".)
- — (May 30, 2022). "Big breaks : how Kai Lenny learned to surf the unsurfable". The Sporting Scene. The New Yorker. 98 (14): 32–43. (Note: Online version is entitled "Kai Lenny surfs the unsurfable".)

———————
