= Gregg Weaver =

American skateboarder (born 1961)

Gregg Weaver (born January 9, 1961) is a skateboarder who was a part of San Diego's famed skate scene and one of skateboarding's early superstars. During the resurgence of skateboarding in the early to mid-1970s, he was one of the most heavily photographed riders being a favorite subject of both Warren Bolster and Art Brewer.

When Skateboarder Magazine was re-issued in 1975 (after 10 years of being defunct), Gregg was featured on the cover of its inaugural re-issue, and the magazine used to receive more fan mail for Gregg than any other skater. Gregg was nicknamed 'The Cadillac Kid' on account of his sponsorship by Frank Nasworthy, who owned Cadillac Wheels.

Gregg now lives in Huntington Beach, California.
