= Tom Sims =

American snowboarder

- Born: Thomas Paul Simeon; December 6, 1950; Los Angeles, California, U.S.
- Died: September 12, 2012 (aged 61); Santa Barbara, California, U.S.
- Occupations: Inventor, professional athlete, entrepreneur
- Known for: Inventing the snowboard
- Spouse: Hilary Sims
- Children: 5

Tom Sims (December 6, 1950 – September 12, 2012) was an American athlete, inventor, and entrepreneur. Sims was World Snowboarding Champion (1983), World Champion Skateboarder (1975), and founder of SIMS Snowboards and SIMS Skateboards. He lived in Santa Barbara, California from 1971 until his death.

In 1963, in his 7th-grade wood-shop class at Haddonfield Central School in his hometown of Haddonfield, New Jersey, he and John Murray made what they called a "skiboard", combining their two favorite sports, skiing and skateboarding. He attended Haddonfield Memorial High School, which honored him in 1998 for a lifetime achievement award.

In the 1985 James Bond film A View to a Kill, Sims was the main snowboarding stunt double for Roger Moore, helping to popularize snowboarding. Since 2006, the SIMS Snowboards brand has been managed by Collective Licensing International, LLC, a unit of Collective Brands Inc., though Tom Sims was still very active in the company. Tom continued to be personally involved in the design and testing of the new snowboard and skateboard equipment being developed under the SIMS brand until his death.

Sims died on September 12, 2012, at a hospital near his home in Santa Barbara, California at the age of 61, from complications due to cardiac arrest.
