= Skateboarder (magazine) =

- October 1965 cover, featuring Patti McGee
- Categories: Skateboarding
- Frequency: Monthly
- Founded: 1964
- Final issue: 2013
- Company: GrindMedia
- Country: USA
- Language: English
- Website: skateboardermag.com
- ISSN: 1535-2889

Skateboarder was a skateboarding publication that produced a limited run of hard copy versions that are sold in skateboard shops. The publication was the United States' first skateboarding magazine. in August 2013, its editor was Jaime Owens and its publisher was Jamey Stone. On August 19, 2013, the magazine's owner GrindMedia announced that the publication would cease production on October 15, 2013.

== History ==
=== First iteration: 1964–1965 ===
The magazine was first published in Winter 1964 as a quarterly under the name The Quarterly Skateboarder—by Surfer Publications out of Dana Point, California, US—during the first skateboarding boom. In August 1965 the title was changed to Skateboarder and the magazine began to be published bimonthly. In his first editorial, John Severson wrote:

Today's skateboarders are founders in this sport—they're pioneers—they are the first. There is no history in Skateboarding—its being made now—by you. The sport is being molded and we believe that doing the right thing now will lead to a bright future for the sport. Already, there are storm clouds on the horizon with opponents of the sport talking about ban and restriction.

After an initial release of only four issues between 1964 and December 1965, however, skateboarding had largely disappeared by Christmas 1965; the publication ceased until the first major skateboard revival of the early 1970s.

=== 1975 relaunch ===
The production of Skateboarder resumed in 1975, with Gregg Weaver featured on the first cover of the bi-monthly publication; it became a monthly publication in late 1977. Warren Bolster (1944–2006) was the editor of the magazine during its second incarnation and he also enlisted the services of Jim Evans, an artist/designer friend who illustrated the relaunched magazine.

Production of the magazine ceased once again in the 1980s.

=== 1997 relaunch ===
Another relaunch occurred in 1997, with an oversized special issue that guest-edited by Tony Hawk, with art direction by Jaimie Muehlhausen. The success of this special issue led to another issue in the following year—the bi-monthly form was reinstated in 1999 and a monthly frequency was eventually established.

In April 2013, GrindMedia, the owner of the magazine, decided to replace the subscription-based print magazine with a free digital edition and a bimonthly print replica of the digital issue. On August 19, 2013, a press release from GrindMedia announced the discontinuation of the publication following the release of its third digital edition. Publisher Norb Garrett stated:

Unfortunately market conditions have forced us to have to make the difficult decision ... our Skateboarder team has worked incredibly hard producing a cutting-edge product that has been successful at reaching a larger audience online. We will take all of the learnings from Skateboarder’s efforts and apply them to TransWorld Skateboarding and our other brands as the digital model has demonstrated real promise.

GrindMedia acquired the TransWorld Skateboarding publication from Bonnier Corporation in May 2013.

== See also ==
- Source Interlink
- Publishing
