= Surfer (magazine) =

Monthly sports magazine in the US (1962–2020, 2024–present)

- Surfer Magazine Cover April, 2011
- Editor: Todd Prodanovich
- Categories: Sports magazine
- Frequency: Monthly
- Total circulation: 96,402 (2014)
- Founder: John Severson
- Founded: 1962
- Final issue: 2020 (print)
- Company: The Arena Group
- Country: United States
- Based in: Carlsbad, California
- Language: English
- Website: www.surfer.com
- ISSN: 0039-6036

Surfer is an American quarterly magazine periodical focused on surfing and surf culture, founded in 1962 by noted surfer, writer, photographer, artist and humorist John Severson (1933–2017). The magazine went on hiatus from 2020 until August 2024.

Surfer began as a quarterly publication, then a bi-monthly, subsequently becoming a monthly. When Severson sold Surfer in the late 1960s to For Better Living, the magazine had around 100,000 active world-wide subscribers.

The magazine changed ownership and management numerous times over its history. American Media (AMI) purchased the magazine in 2019 from TEN: Publishing, a division of Adventure Sports Network (ASN).

The magazine's last editor-in-chief was Todd Prodanovich and its photo editor was Grant Ellis.

== History ==
John Severson originally created The Surfer as a collection of prints of his still surfing photography used to promote live screenings of his surfing movies. He gave them out as flyers at the shows, then after heavy requests for more decided to sell them. His first quarterly issues had a cover price of 75 cents and at the time it was the single most expensive magazine in the country. After filming Mickey Muñoz' exhibit some of his unconventional surfing stances at Malibu, Severson chose the remarkable image of Muñoz in his Quasimodo stance for the magazine cover of the first issue.

Severson also wanted to counter the popular depiction of the sport and surf culture as seen in the 1959 film Gidget. In his 2014 book John Severson Surf, he wrote "surfers hated those Hollywood surf films, and I could see that Surfer could create a truer image of the sport." Severson's photography, art and humor set the tone for the future of Surfer, which quickly grew to reflect the sport and the culture, as well as become a voice for surfers and environmental activism.

Surfer Magazine became the de facto 'Bible' of the sport, and for decades was the number one source of inspiration and surf culture news in the world, The magazine was revered not just in the US, but in Europe, Australia, Africa, Asia, and all of Latin America & the Pacific. Severson established a tradition of including fiction, and from the very beginning, Surfer Magazine published short stories as a regular feature.

Severson sold Surfer, the date reported variously as "in 1970;" alternately "in 1971" directly to Steve Pezman; and also alternately "in the late 1960s" to For Better Living, an Auburn, California-based company founded by F.G. 'Bud' Fabian. Bud Fabian had retired from For Better Living in 1996, a company whose primary business was precast concrete. At the time, the magazine was produced by Surfer Publications, a subsidiary of For Better Living and at least the late 1990s, was based in San Juan Capistrano.

Drew Kampion was editor of the magazine from 1968 to 1972. Noted writer and surf historian Matt Warshaw, became a writer for Surfer, beginning in 1984, becoming the publication's editor in 1990. At Surfer, Warshaw mentored numerous journalists, giving them a place on the editorial staff and connecting independent authors with editors and surfing personalities.

In 2019, when asked about 2019 purchase of Surfer by American Media (AMI), widely known for its National Enquirer publication, Warshaw said, "Surfer, best-case scenario, is in for a very rough year or two, then American Media puts it up for sale and it gets bought as a vanity project, the way Jeff Bezos bought the Washington Post. Surfer will at that point be reborn in whatever form the rich benefactor dictates."

Editor Todd Prodanovich and the other four full-time staffers were furloughed October 2, 2020 and publication was halted. In 2022, The Arena Group acquired the Surfer digital brand.
