= Aerial (skateboarding) =

Type of skateboarding trick

Aerials (or more commonly airs) are a type of skateboarding trick usually performed on half-pipes, pools or quarter pipes where there is a vertical wall with a transition (curved surface linking the wall and the ground) available. Aerials typically combine rotation with different grabs. Most of the different types of grabs were originally aerial tricks that were performed in ditches, empty pools, and vert ramps before flatground aerials became common. Aerials can be executed by ollieing just as the front wheels reach the lip of a ramp, or can be executed simply by lifting the front wheels over the coping (or lip). The former is preferable on shallower ramps where the skateboarder has less speed to lift them above the ramp.

== Common aerial tricks ==
| 180 | In general use, the term "180" is an aerial where the skater and board spin a half rotation. In common use, the term refers to an Ollie 180 performed on flat terrain, where the skater starts rolling forward, Ollies, turns a half rotation, and lands backward. The same trick can be done on a bank, transition, or vert wall, but the difference is that the skater lands forwards. This is usually called a Frontside Ollie or Backside Ollie depending on the direction of rotation. A backside 180 started from fakie is called half-Cab as it's half the rotation of a Caballerial (see below). |
| 360 | An air where the skater and board spin one full rotation. It can be performed almost anywhere whether it be on vert or street. On vert, this is most commonly performed from fakie so that the rider completes the 360 facing forward. Jeff Phillips was one of the first skaters to perform this while landing fakie (usually doing a lien grab). |
| 540 | A 540 is an aerial where the skater and board spin one and a half rotations in midair. They were first performed on vertical ramps and quickly became a staple of vertical skateboarding at the professional level, but they have also been performed on box jumps, pyramids, downstairs, and even on mini-halfpipes. In the early 1980s, Billy Ruff invented the Unit, the precursor to the modern 540. He would early-grab the front rail and twist frontside, briefly putting his other hand down on the transition in order to push off the wall, which made it easier to get the whole spin. Since he had to put his hand down, the Unit was always done below the coping. In 1984, Tony Hawk took it to the next level when he invented the Frontside 540 (the inverted version of which is now known as the "Rodeo Flip"). Soon after, for some reason, he lost the trick, and it did not gain any sort of popularity until much later. In 1984, Mike McGill, then a pro skater for Powell, invented the McTwist, which is easily the most popular 540 variation (see below). A flood of variations soon followed, including almost every conceivable grab while spinning either direction, no grabs at all (Ollie 540), as well as versions combined with a Varial, Kickflip, or Heelflip. |
| 720 | The 720, two full mid-air rotations, is one of the rarest tricks in skateboarding. It was first done by Tony Hawk in 1985, and it was not something he planned to do. He accidentally over-rotated a Gay Twist and Lance Mountain suggested that he might be able to spin twice. After less than an hour, he landed it and has done it consistently ever since. Like a Gay Twist, 720s are usually done from fakie-grabbing Mute Air, but there have been a few different variations. Besides inventing the stock 720, Hawk also was the first to do Stalefish and Varial variations. Danny Way was the first to do indy 720s. Colin McKay and Jake Brown have both done Tailgrab 720s. Shaun White and Mitchie Brusco do a Backside Grab 720 consistently, and Matt Dove landed an impressive pop shuvit indy 720 at the 2001 X-Games. Bucky Lasek has landed an indy grab forward to fakie backside variation, while Mike Callahan, a former pro from Chicago, has been known to do a frontside unit 720 variation. |
| 900 | The skater spins 900 degrees backside in the air, usually while grabbing Mute Air. It is arguably the most widely covered trick in the history of skateboarding, as Tony Hawk landed it for the first time at the 1999 X-Games following the best trick competition. The celebration on the ramp quickly snowballed into newspaper and television coverage which helped make Tony Hawk a household name. Five years later, Giorgio Zattoni and Sandro Dias both landed their first 900s within a week of each other. Since then, Alex Perelson landed it at the 2008 Maloof Money Cup, then Mitchie Brusco completed it at X Games 17 during Big Air Practice. |
| 1080 | The skater spins 1,080 degrees (3 full rotations) backside or frontside in the air. The trick was long considered to be impossible. However, on March 30, 2012, 12-year-old American, Tom Schaar, landed it on the Woodward California Mega Ramp in five attempts. Schaar rode in fakie turned backside and grabbed Mute Air to complete the required three rotations. Riding fakie allowed Schaar to land forward after completing the three rotations. Jono Schwan also accomplished the maneuver. Mitchie Brusco later completed the trick at the X-Games in Barcelona in May 2013. |
| 1260 | The 1260 (3 and a half full rotations) was landed by Mitchie Brusco at the X-Games Minneapolis 2019. |
| Airwalk | A no-footed Backside Air where the front hand grabs the nose. The front foot is kicked off the toe-side of the board, while the back foot is kicked off the heel side, producing the impression of walking in the air. Rodney Mullen was the first to do it on flat ground, while Tony Hawk was the first to do it on vert. |
| Backflip | The Backflip is an aerial where the rider and their board complete a full rotation on the lateral axis. If the trick is done by launching out of the ramp, the skater lands forwards. If it is done on the wall of a vert ramp, the skater lands backward, adding significantly to the difficulty and danger involved. It was first done in 1997 by Rob "Sluggo" Boyce because he "had seen BMX bikers, rollerbladers, and snowboarders do Backflips and thought it was about time a skateboarder did one." He first learned to do it in a gymnasium by launching off a ramp and landing in a foam pit. Once he was comfortable with the technique, he learned to do it on a vert ramp. Despite the trick's appearance in many skateboarding video games, the real trick is still more legendary than commonplace. |
| Frontflip | The Frontflip is similar to a backflip except the skater flips towards the front foot. It requires a little more air than a Backflip because the rotation is typically slower |
| Backside Air | A Backside Air is performed by riding up the transition, grabbing the board on the heel side with the front hand, lifting off, turning backside (toward the skater's toes) and landing forward. It is considered a staple of vertical skateboarding. Some skaters grab the board between the trucks, while others grab the nose. |
| Benihana | A one-footed tail grab, taking the back foot off and kicking straight down or sideways in a backward direction. The idea is for the skater to take the back foot off and use the front foot to kick the board out ahead, and then catch the board by the tail and put it back underneath. Invented by Lester Kasai and named by Lester and Tony Hawk because at the time they were eating at Benihana restaurants as often as they could. |
| Body Jar | A Backside Air grabbing the nose where the rider smacks the tail of the board on the coping on the way in. Invented by Christian Hosoi. |
| Caballerial | A fakie backside 360 ollie. Invented by Steve Caballero in 1981. |
| Candy Flip | A Rodeo combined with a Varial. Invented by Andy MacDonald. |
| Cannonball | An aerial where the rider grabs the nose with the front hand and the tail with the backhand. |
| Christ Air | A backside air where the board is grabbed on the heel rail with the forward hand, and the body strikes a "crucifix"-like pose. Originally invented by Christian Hosoi. Can be performed frontside as well, or even a frontside finger-flip variation as performed by Monty Nolder. |
| Chicken Wing Frontside Air | A Del Mar Indy, but going frontside instead of backside. Also known as the Wig Air (term coined by Neil Blender). Invented and popularized by John Thomas. |
| Crail Grab | A frontside air variation where the nose of the board is grabbed with the hand furthest from the movement. |
| Crossbone | AKA Crossbone Lien Air, a crossbones is a lien air where the skater pushes the back foot forward and the front foot back attempting to “cross” their legs. Invented and popularized by Chris Miller. |
| Del Mar Indy | A Tuck-Knee Indy where the skater tweaks it back behind his back pointing his knees down. Similar to a Japan Air. |
| Fakie Ollie | A no grab Ollie air where the skater rides up the ramp backwards, ollies without spinning and lands on the ramp going forward again. First invented on vert by Kevin Staab. |
| Frontside Air | Likely the first aerial to be done on a skateboard, as it is one of the easiest to learn. It involves going up the transition, grabbing the board on the toe side between the feet with the trailing hand, lifting off, turning frontside (toward the skater's back), and then landing and riding down the ramp. It is a matter of dispute who did the first Frontside Air (it was possibly first done by George Orton in the Birdy Bowl), but Tony Alva is widely credited with making it popular. It is said that George Orton did the first bio fs air and Tony Alva did the first one with style. In the first few years of doing this trick, all skaters grabbed the board before lifting off (known as an "early grab"). Eventually, it became common practice to Ollie first, then grab the board. However, Ollieing it is much more difficult, and so it is still common to see skateboarders perform the trick early-grab style. |
| Frigid Air | An anti judo air. The skater kicks his forward foot behind him instead of in front of him. |
| Gay Twist | A Fakie Mute 360, or a Caballerial with a Mute grab. It was named a "Gay Twist" because Lance Mountain and Neil Blender (who invented it together) could not do Caballerials after attempting them for a month, so they decided to try to grab them. Since their bodies required spinning momentum to make the full 360 to land moving forward, they needed to spin their shoulders, which prevented them from grabbing in the stylish, preferred manner, around the knee. The alternative was grabbing the board, with their forward hand on the toe rail of the board, between the legs, or stink bug, which they thought was "gay". Most skaters do consider this trick to be easier. Like the Caballerial, the Gay Twist has spawned numerous variations over the years. Some found it easier to grab backside instead of Mute Air, which they called a "Les Twist". Other notable offspring of the Gay Twist include the Frontside Gay Twist, Kickflip and Heelflip Gay Twists, Varial Gay Twist, and the 720. |
| Grossman Air | Grabbing the heel edge with the front hand between the legs. The Roastbeef air was originally called the Grossman air. Invented by Jeff Grosso. |
| Half Cab | A no grab Ollie air where the skater rides up the ramp backwards, ollies, spins 180 degrees backside and lands fakie. First invented on vert by Kevin Staab and Tony Hawk. |
| Helipop | This is more of a freestyle or street skating trick than most other aerials. It is essentially the same trick as a Caballerial, but instead of doing a 360 fakie, it is a 360 Nollie with a short pivot on the back wheels before completing the full rotation. This was invented by Rodney Mullen and has been done both backside and frontside. |
| Indy | The Indy is done by grabbing the toe-side rail with the backhand while doing a backside air. Invented by Duane Peters in 1981, who was riding for the Independent Truck Company at the time, hence the name Indy. This trick was debatably done first by Gunnar Haugo and dubbed the “Gunnair” in 1978. Note that an Indy Air cannot be performed when turning frontside, it is by nature a backside-turning air. An aerial with the same grab location, but turning frontside is known as frontside air. |
| Japan Air | Essentially a Mute Air where the skater pulls the board up behind his back and knees pointed down for added style. |
| Judo Air | A Backside air where the skater takes his front foot off the board and kicks it forward and pulls the board backward while the back foot is still on the board. The name of the trick stems from the appearance that the skater is doing a martial arts-style kick in mid-air even though competitive Judo forbids the use of kicks. |
| Lien Air | Another of the basic airs. It is a frontside air grabbing the nose or heel edge with the front hand (leading hand). Neil Blender was the first to perform this trick, which became known as the Lien Air. Lien is Neil spelled backwards. Variations: Lien to tail (invented by Allen Losi), fingerflip lien to tail (losi). |
| Madonna | A one-footed lien to tail, where the front foot is taken off and kicked out straight down (behind the board), was invented by Tony Hawk not long after Madonna's first album was released. It was named the Madonna because Tony and his friends were fans of the performer. |
| McTwist | The McTwist is an aerial where the rider performs an inverted backside 540 while grabbing Mute Air on the toe rail, with the forward hand, around the knee. Other 540 aerials came later, and they are generally known by the style of grab and the rotation, as in "backside 540" abbreviated to "Indy 5". Invented by Mike McGill, who first performed it on a wooden half-pipe in Sweden in 1984. The move is also notable for its appearance in the game Tony Hawk's Underground where in the Hawaii level of the story mode, the player character must pull off the trick while jumping off a building, over a police helicopter, and onto the awning of the Royal Hawaiian Hotel. |
| Melancholy/Melon | A Backside Air is where the skater grabs the board on the heel edge between the feet with their front hand and tweaks the board as forward as possible for added style. |
| Method Air | Another Backside Air variation is where the skater straightens their hips and bends their knees so the board goes up behind their back. Invented by Neil Blender and initially called Methodist Air, the name was shortened not long after the original photo ran in Transworld Skateboarding in 1984. |
| No Comply | The No Comply is an alternate method of getting air. The rider pops the board's tail, simultaneously planting the front foot in the ground. They then launch off their 'planted' foot while catching the board with the inside of the back leg, returning the front foot to the board for landing. There are many variations including the Frontside Pop Shove-It No Comply, the No Comply up a curb, the No Comply 360, etc. All can be done by altering the back foot position and how much pop and spin the skater puts on his board. An alternate version of this trick is called the "De-Comply". It is the opposite of a No Comply. |
| Nosebone | A Nosebone frontside air is a frontside air where the skater straights or “bones out” the front leg. Invented by Neil Blender, but popularized by Chris Miller. Indy Nosebone is the backside version. |
| Nosegrab | The Nosegrab is similar to the Tailgrab. However, instead of grabbing the tail (back) of the board, the rider grabs the nose (front). The rider ollies, pop their back foot off the board, and grabs the nose (front) of the skateboard. Once the rider lets go, the rider must set their back foot over the back bolts and their front foot over the front bolts. |
| Roastbeef | Performed similarly to a Stalefish, however, the skater grabs the heel edge of the board with their trailing hand in between the legs, rather than wrapping the arm behind. Named and popularized by Jeff Grosso, it is much simpler to execute than a Stalefish, and is sometimes referred to as the "poor man's stalefish". |
| Rocket Air | An air where the skateboarder grabs the nose of the skateboard with both hands and at the same time places both feet on the tail, turning sideways momentarily before returning to regular stance and landing. Invented by Christian Hosoi. |
| Sack Tap | A sack tap is when the skater flies into the air off a ramp, grabs their board in mid-air with both hands, and taps their testicles then puts the board back under their feet and lands on the ground. Invented by Tony Hawk. |
| Saran Wrap | Taken from a freestyle trick invented by Rodney Mullen, this air is performed by grabbing the backside with the front hand and then kicking or "wrapping" the front leg forward in a circular motion around the nose of the board. Once the leg has wrapped at least 180 around the board, the backhand grabs like frontside air while the backhand is released and the front foot is placed back on the board. |
| Sean Penn | Sean Penn is similar to a Madonna except the skateboarder turns backside instead of frontside, kicking the front foot back and off the heel side of the board before hitting the tail on the coping. It was named because Sean Penn was married to Madonna at the time it was invented, and thus was the opposite of a Madonna. Possibly invented by Mark Rogowski, who popularized it. |
| Slob-Air | A frontside air grabbing mute. It is performed by leading the hand on the toe side of the board between the feet, launching off the coping turning frontside, and landing. While Slob-Airs, Slob-Bonelesses, and Slob Fastplants were common in the 1980s, they are still staples of transition skateboarding. In more recent times, Tony Hawk made a Heelflip Slob Air and Lincoln Ueda landed a Slob 540. |
| Stalefish | One of the more difficult aerial variations. A Stalefish is a heel-side grab with the backhand reaching around the back leg, meaning it is not only awkward to reach, but necessitates that the skater grabs quite late in the air. As for the name, it came from a camper at a Swedish skate camp where Tony Hawk was practicing. One day Tony landed the first Stalefish, but did not have a name for it yet. During dinner, the only food they had to eat at the camp was canned fish. The dinner apparently was not too appetizing to Tony, who called it "stale fish". The camper he was with misunderstood and assumed he was naming his new trick, and it stuck. |
| Stiffy | A more sophisticated grab trick, the Stiffy is a variant of the Indy grab. The skater is in the same position as the Indy, but the skater is at a 90° angle. The skater shakes the board with their trailing hand. This trick requires lots of air to perform. |
| Tailbone | A Tailbone frontside air is a frontside air where the skater straights or “bones out” the back leg. Originally just dubbed the “Boned Out Frontside Air”. Popularized by Allen Losi. |
| Tailgrab | The skater pops either side of the board, reaches behind, and grabs the tail with their hand. Generally considered one of the hardest of the basic aerials to do, since grabbing the tail adds little stability and tends to want to make the front foot come off the board. |
| Tailwalk | Similar to the Airwalk, only the skater grabs the tail of the board instead of the nose. |
| Varial | A Varial was originally a Frontside Air where the skater reached between the legs and grabbed the board on the heel edge with the backhand (now known as a Roastbeef grab), then turned the board 180 degrees frontside with the hand before putting it back on the feet and landing. Like all Frontside Airs at the time, they were performed without an Ollie (early grab). This version, however, is not very common anymore. Tony Hawk invented the Backside Varial in 1980, adding an Ollie in the process. Before long, 360 Varials, where the skater turns the board 360 degrees backside and grabs it, became commonplace. After the invention of the Kickflip Indy, most professional vert skaters had to be able to perform one to win a contest, and soon they were looking for ways to increase the difficulty. One of the ways was to spin the board 180 degrees during the Kickflip, which ended up being called a Varial Kickflip Indy. Somehow the term filtered back into street skating and it became common for a Kickflip combined with a Pop Shove (180 spin of the board) to be called a Varial Kickflip. Some have even gone so far as to drop the "kickflip" from the name altogether, calling a Kickflip Shove-it a "Varial". However, vertical skateboarders still use the term Varial to describe any trick involving spinning the board and grabbing it. |
| Wall-Ride | A trick where a rider transitions onto a vertical wall and continues to travel along it with all four wheels touching the wall until then transitioning to the flat ground, a bank, or a curved ramp. A wall ride can be combined with other tricks such as the kickflip, both in and out, and doing so adds a significant increase in the difficulty level. |
| Weddle/Mute Air | Performed by riding up the transition and grabbing with the front hand on the toe side of the board around the front leg and between the feet, turning backside, and landing. It is the same grab as a slob-air, but the skater turns in the opposite direction. It is now used in surfing, snowboarding, and skiing, and is one of the most common tricks in each sport. The trick was first performed by deaf skateboarder Chris Weddle around 1981. It was named the "mute air" by other skateboarders who referred to him as the "quiet, mute guy." In August 2020, after having a conversation with Weddle about the trick's origins, Tony Hawk announced that in Tony Hawk's Pro Skater 1 + 2, the trick would be renamed the Weddle Grab to honor Weddle's legacy better, as Weddle is deaf, but not lacking speech. |

== Aerial terminology ==
| Air | When a skater is riding with all four wheels off the ground. It is short for aerial. |
| Backside | When a skater executes a trick or turn with their back facing the ramp or obstacle, it is called backside. |
| Early grab | A grab trick in which the skateboarder grabs their board before leaving the ground or ramp. |
| Frontside | When a skater executes a trick or turn with the front of their body facing the ramp or obstacle, it is called frontside. |
| Grab | When a skater uses their hand or hands to hold the board during a trick. |
| Shifty | A trick variation that involves the skater shifting their board 90 degrees (or close to it), with their feet still in contact with the board, then bringing it back to its starting position. Usually done with tweak grabs or grabs of the like. It is used to add extra style to tricks. |
| Tweak | A technic used to add style to a trick by exaggerating or contorting it, typically by extending it further than normal. This mostly refers to grab tricks. |
| Vert | Type of skating in which ramps and other vertical structures specifically designed for skating are used. These types of parks are used by skaters to perform aerial tricks. |
| Vert ramp | A half-pipe, usually at least eight feet tall, with steep sides that are perfectly vertical near the top. These are typically used to perform aerial tricks. |
