= Lester Kasai =

American skateboarder (born 1966)

Lester Kasai (born August 12, 1966) is an American retired professional skateboarder.

== Biography ==
Kasai grew up in Anaheim, California. He began skating at a young age and was one of the original "Sadlands" team skateboard riders.

He emerged as one of the top competitors of vert riding alongside such pros as Steve Caballero, Mike McGill, Christian Hosoi, and Mark "Gator" Rogowski.

== Notable tricks ==
The Madonna grab, invented by Tony Hawk, was named by Hawk and Kasai. Kasai invented the Benihana.

Kasai was the second person to do a McTwist, a few days after Mike McGill. He injured himself performing the trick shortly after and as a result no longer does the trick.

== See also ==
- Christian Hosoi
- Grabs (skateboarding)
