= Lip trick =

Skateboarding trick

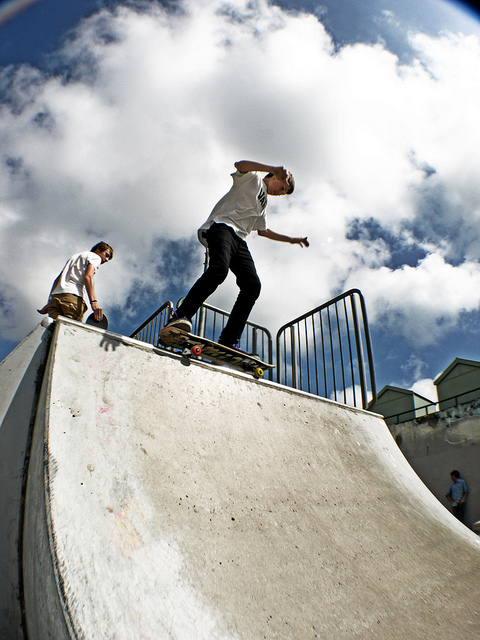
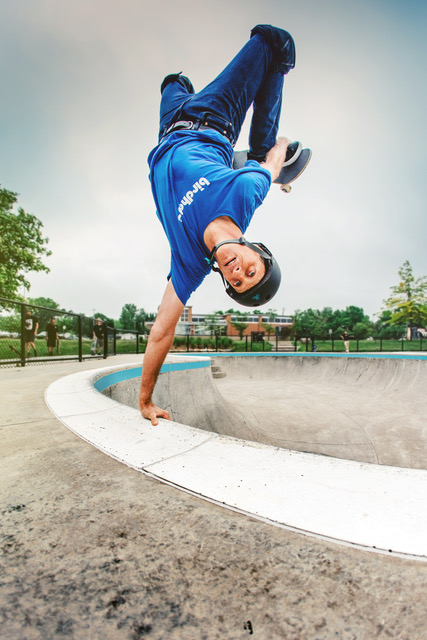
An axle stall (left) and an invert (right, performed by Tony Hawk)

Lip tricks in skateboarding are performed on half-pipes, quarterpipes and mini ramps. They are tricks that require different varieties of balance on the "lip" of the ramp. The first lip trick done was by Jay Adams.

== Stalls ==
Axle stall	An axle stall is a stall on both trucks of a skateboard. It is used commonly to regain composure before performing another trick or to "drop in" on a ramp. Essentially a stationary 50-50. Can be done frontside or backside.
Bastard Plant	Backside Boneless One to fakie.
Bean Plant	A nosegrab or melon grab (a.k.a. lien grab—hence the name) wherein the front foot is planted from the heel edge of the board. Though originally performed frontside it is most commonly done to fakie. Invented by Neil Blender. ("Lien" is "Neil" spelled backward.)
Half Shave Plant	A no comply slob grab. Invented by Gage Flynn.
Blunt to Fakie	The back truck is placed over the lip of the ramp and the tail is placed on the lip, appearing like a stationary blunt stall, hence the name. A small ollie is then performed to come off the lip and ride back down the ramp in fakie. It can also be done with a small 180 ollie out. Originally, this trick was pulled back in with a variety of grabs and invented by Kevin Staab.
Boneless One	Originally, a frontside footplant in which the grab is standard frontside, preferably tuck-knee, remove the front foot from the heel-side rail, boost, place it back on the board and release well before the board re-enters. The backside variant, invented by Steve Caballero, is a standard backside grab with the front foot coming off the toe-side rail. Boosting (ideally), place the foot back on and release the grab before the board re-enters.
Crailtap	A crailtap is a tailtap but done while holding the board's nose with the trailing hand (crail grab) and pivoting the board on the tip of its tail.
Dark stall	Stalling on a coping or edge while having the board be upside down so the grip side is touching the ground. Invented by Rodney Mullen.
Disaster	Invented by the "Master of Disaster" Duane Peters, this trick is where the skater ollies 180 degrees and lands in the center of his board with the front trucks facing towards the ramp and the back trucks over the lip. The skater then leans forwards to return in the ramp.
Footplant/Fastplant	A backside air grabbing melon with the back foot coming off and planting on the coping, stalling, and coming back in regular, invented by Eric Grisham. A Fastplant is a high-speed backside foot-plant, boosting, and put back on the tail well before the board re-enters the ramp/pool/bank. Invented by Neil Blender. F/S Footplant is a frontside air with the back foot planting on the coping. Basically, an Indyplant going frontside.
Feeble	Much like the 50-50 however the front truck extends over the coping or top of the ramp, lapped over the "wrong way," so to speak.
Hurricane	A backside carving approach at the lip or curb into an alley-oop frontside fakie grind, often with the heel-side rail sliding along with the back truck grinding—the front truck is in a feeble orientation. Originally, the hurricane was done to a fast 270 back-truck pivot to forward re-entry, but they can also be done to fakie.
I Can Hear Fine	Backside Boneless grabbing Mute.
Indy Plant	Backside footplant with the back foot planting and grabbing Indy. Popularized by Tom Groholski
Lien Plant	A frontside Fastplant grabbing lien (front heel side edge). Popularized by Mark Rogowski and Neil Blender.
New Deal	Invented by Neil Blender. Essentially a nosepick snapped off into a disaster. Can also be done while grinding, then sliding.
Nose blunt	Either 180 up to the lip, or come up fakie and land on the front foot with the nose and truck balancing on the edge of the coping. A nollie or grab is then done to come back into the ramp. tailgrab and frontside grab is recommended.
Nose pick	A stall on the front truck which is grabbed for re entry. May be done B/S or F/S.
Nose stall	A trick where the skater reaches the top of the transition, leans on the skateboard's nose atop the ramp, and drops back in switch or reverts to regular either frontside or backside.
Pivot	the most basic go up and turn around on the back truck. Add a little flair by slashing at the coping instead. frontside or backside.
Pogo	Any air straight up and then landing in a rock and roll. Popularized by Craig Johnson, who would do them 5 feet or higher. Also see "Sally Rock."
Revert	Performing a Pivot immediately after an air.
Rock and Roll	Similar to the Rock to Fakie only a quick 180 is done while coming off the lip so that the skater do not ride fakie. The frontside variation, originated by Eddie Elguera, is much harder and is considered one of the most stylish lip tricks.
Rock to Fakie/Fakie Rock	This is a quick, common and easy lip trick performed mostly to link tricks together on mini ramps. The front truck is placed over the lip of the ramp and then the board is "rocked" slightly before coming back down backwards (fakie).
Sally Rock	Ollie air straight up and then landing in a rock and roll to fakie. Proper execution is done fluid and fast. Sometimes referred to as a "Pop Rock." Invented by Salman Agah.
Slob Plant	Frontside Fastplant grabbing slob.
Smith	A trick where the back trucks are on the coping and the front trucks aimed into the ramp. Can be done as a stall or grinded. The frontside version was invented by Mike Smith, while the backside version was invented by Monty Nolder.
Staple Gun	A rider rides straight up and off the ramp while placing the back foot on the transition below the coping. The board is then stomped down onto the platform with the front foot and pulled back into the ramp toward the back ankle. Hopping of the back foot and back onto the board, the rider rides away fakie.
Sugar Cane	Like the hurricane except with an ollie 270 into a Smith grind.
Sweeper	Similar to a lein-to-tail. A fronstide nose grab foot plant, where the back foot is taken off and rests on the coping. Variation: Creeper - a crail grab sweeper. Invented by Duane Peters.
Tailtap/Tailblock	Backside/stand-up pivot stall, balancing on the bottom tip of the tail while grabbing the nose with the front hand. Can be done with the back hand also (crailtap/crailblock) Again, stall it out. Then guide the board back in with the hand. Dates back to the very late 70's or early 80's.
Texas Plant	Go up to the lip frontside and take the back foot off and plant it on the coping, while grabbing the tail and extending the front leg. Traditionally there is a slight pause before the skater jumps back while simultaneously returning the rear foot to its proper location.
Texas Two-Step	Identical to a Texas Plant, except that, like in a Switch-Foot Pogo, the rider constantly (until dropping back in) alternates the planted foot.
Thruster	A fakie tail grab foot plant, where the back foot boosts off the coping. Can be done straight up and down, or moving across the coping. Invented by Duane Peters, popularized by Craig Johnson.

== Inverts/Handplants ==
Invert	This is a basic lip trick where the skater grabs his board and plants a hand on the coping so that they are balancing upside down on the lip of the ramp. Many variations as to where the board is grabbed and how the legs are arranged make for a number of different tricks of this type. Examples are: Eggplant (backside invert with front hand on lip), Andrecht Invert (backside invert with backside grab, with very bent legs and back, often stalled—invented by Dave Andrecht), Gymnast Plant (no footed), Sadplant (backside invert with fully extended front leg—invented by Lance Mountain), and One Foot Invert, the Unit (540 frontside handplant)
Egg Plant	This invert differs from others in that the front hand is on the coping, while the back hand is grabbing like an Indy. Variation: 540 McEgg (invented by Mike McGill).
Everybody	"fully extended" fakie invert named so because Neil Blender (influential to the invert craze) tried this trick at a contest by the request of Lance Mountain "to fool everybody" thinking this would be a cool trick. Hence "everybody" was trying this attempted trick at the next contest. supposedly an inside joke between Lance Mountain and Neil Blender. See "Good Buddy"
Fall Guy	Frontside invert to fakie. made popular by Lance Mountain
Frontside Invert	Another Invert where the front hand is on the coping, rather than the back hand. The back hand grabs like a frontside air.
Good Buddy	A fakie invert not "fully extended". Popularized by Mike McGill and Mark "Gator" Rogowski. This invert is a predecessor of the "fully extended" fakie invert called the "Everybody" invented by Neil Blender.
Ho-Ho	This is where both hands are on the coping at the same time at one point during the trick, enabling the person to walk on their hands if so desired. Both hands must be on the coping because the trick is actually an invert to eggplant. The Ha-Ha is similar except that it is basically a stalled invert where the front hand briefly rests on the coping before returning to grab the board. The Ho-Ho was conceived by Neil Blender, but first done by either Jeff Kendall or Steve Schneer.
Jolly Mambo	A stalled frontside invert in which you stop rotating in the middle before you flip all the way around into the fakie position. Basically a Stalled Miller Flip. Invented by Neil Blender. *In Bones Brigade Video Three it is comically referred to as a "frontside Jelly Mumbo." See Miller Flip
Layback Air	An invert-like trick done frontside while grabbing slob and placing the back hand on the coping. Essentially an invert done frontside, with the rear hand planted on the lip. Variations: to board to frontside rock, to tail, to revert, to fakie, or to invert. Invented by Kelly Lynn.
Miller Flip	A frontside invert in which you flip all the way around into the fakie position. basically a vertical cartwheel. Invented by Darrell "Knarles" Miller.
Phillips 66	Basically similar to the reverse of a Miller flip, where the lip is approached fakie, back hand on the coping and the body is flipped in a frontflip-like motion and landing to roll away forward. Invented by Shawn Peddie and made famous by Jeff Phillips.
Sad Plant	An invert whereby the skater's front leg is fully extended. (Lance Mountain)
Smithvert or Smith plant	A regular invert where the board is tweaked in a backside rotation so that the legs are almost crossed, with the toes of the back foot touching the tail. Invented by Mike Smith.
Tailtap	Like a pivot but the back trucks never touch the coping and the skaters front hand is holding the nose of the board.
Tuck-knee Invert	An invert that is grabbed like a Japan Air and tweaked severely, sometimes with the nose of the board hitting the helmet.
Underplant	See "Poliki".
Poliki	Essentially a layback air except the board is grabbed on the outer rail rather than the inner one; Basically a Lein-Invert. More commonly referred to as an Underplant.
Woolly Mammoth	An unusual trick invented by Neil Blender. A fakie frontside handplant to nose blunt, where the back hand grabbing the front rail of the board while the nose and front wheels are resting on the deck behind the coping and the front hand is still on the coping.
