= Tony Hawk's Underground =

2003 video game

- Developer: Neversoft (Note: Ported to Game Boy Advance by Vicarious Visions and ported to Microsoft Windows by Beenox)
- Publisher: Activision
- Series: Tony Hawk's
- Platforms: Game Boy Advance; GameCube; PlayStation 2; Xbox; Mobile (BREW, J2ME); Microsoft Windows
- Release: Game Boy Advance, GameCube, PlayStation 2, Xbox: NA: October 27, 2003; EU: November 21, 2003; Mobile: NA: November 20, 2003; Microsoft Windows: AU: 2004; NZ: 2004
- Genre: Sports
- Modes: Single-player, multiplayer

Tony Hawk's Underground is a 2003 skateboarding video game and the fifth entry in the Tony Hawk's series, following Tony Hawk's Pro Skater 4. It was developed by Neversoft and published by Activision for the GameCube, PlayStation 2, Xbox, and Game Boy Advance. In 2004, it was published for Windows in Australia and New Zealand as a budget release.

Underground is built upon the skateboarding formula of previous Tony Hawk's games: the player explores levels and completes goals while performing tricks. It features a new focus on customization; the player, instead of selecting a professional skater, creates a custom character. Underground adds the ability for players to dismount their boards and explore on foot. The plot follows the player character and their friend Eric Sparrow as the two become professionals and grow apart.

Underground was developed with a theme of individuality which was manifested in the extensive character customization options, the presence of a narrative, and the product's characterization as an adventure game. Real world professional skateboarders contributed their experiences to the plot. Underground was a major critical and commercial success, with reviewers praising its wide appeal, soundtrack, customization, multiplayer, and storyline. The graphics and the controls for driving vehicles and walking were less well received. Underground's PlayStation 2 version had sold 2.11 million copies in the United States by December 2007. A sequel, Tony Hawk's Underground 2, followed in 2004.

== Gameplay ==
Like its predecessors in the Tony Hawk's series, Underground is centered on skateboarding in a series of levels. The player performs tricks via combinations of analog stick and button inputs. For example, the player initiates an ollie (a jump trick) by holding and releasing the jump button. During an ollie, the player may change the position of the analog stick and press one of two buttons to perform either a flip trick (such as an impossible or kickflip) or a grab trick (such as a benihana or nosegrab). The player can grind on certain edges and rails; different tricks may be performed during a grind based on the position of the analog stick. On quarter pipes, the player may execute lip tricks. While skating on flat surfaces, the player may manual in multiple ways via button combinations. Miscellaneous tricks include acid drops and wall-rides.

While a grind, lip, or manual trick is underway, a balance meter appears: unless the player prevents this meter from falling to the left or right, the character will bail and need a few seconds to recover. Bailing can also be caused by falling without one's board facing downward. Completing tricks in succession without bailing is called a combo. Comboing raises the player's score and fills up the Special Meter; when it is full, the player is granted access to more elaborate tricks worth more points, such as the McTwist and 540 Flip. Underground introduces the ability to dismount one's skateboard, which allows the player to explore levels more carefully and reach new areas. Each level features at least one vehicle, usually a car, that the player can drive.

The custom skater performs a 360 Varial Heelflip Lien as an objective in Moscow.

The levels are based on regions of the United States and other countries. In each level, certain tasks that advance the narrative must be completed before the player can move on. These tasks include score attacks, races, item collection, and reaching one of many gaps (Note: Reaching a gap involves crossing from one setpiece to another, such as from an escalating ramp to a quarter-pipe that borders it, or tricking from one balcony of an atrium to the other.) found in a level. Each level houses one professional skateboarder, who provides a sidequest that unlocks a trick for the Special Meter. On account of the levels' large sizes and the integration of goals into the story, Underground has been described as an adventure game. Characters can level up their stats—which include jump height and speed—by completing optional goals in a level; this adds an element of role-playing gameplay. Other gameplay modes include multiplayer minigames—one, a combat mode called "Firefight", can be played online in the PlayStation 2 version—and a "free skate" mode that lets the player explore levels with no goals or story.

Underground features extensive customization. The player creates a custom character for the story mode, and may not play as a pre-made professional skater outside a few contexts: a special scene late in the game, minigames, and the free skate mode. A level editor allows the player to create skate parks with a large array of objects, ranging from traditional skate park elements like halfpipes, ramps, funboxes, and grind rails to more outlandish pieces like buildings and sections of elevated freeways. The player can change their park's time of day and environmental theme. Tricks, skateboards, and level goals may be customized as well.

Underground features many real world professional skateboarders including: Tony Hawk, Bob Burnquist, Paul Rodriguez, Chad Muska, Mike Vallely, Andrew Reynolds, and Stacy Peralta. Underground also features cameo appearances by Iron Man, a parody of C.H.U.D. called T.H.U.D., and Kiss bassist Gene Simmons.

While the console versions are fully three-dimensional, the Game Boy Advance version is rendered in an isometric style that incorporates both 2D sprites and 3D models. This version is a more traditional Tony Hawk's game, with little attention given to the story or customization. The mobile version is similarly restricted.

== Plot ==
The protagonist and their friend, Eric Sparrow, live in suburban New Jersey and dream of becoming famous skateboarders. The protagonist manages to impress professional skater Chad Muska, visiting town for a demo, who gives them a new skateboard and informs them that a good way to start a skating career is to gain a sponsorship from a local skate shop. The protagonist seeks out Stacy Peralta, who agrees to sponsor them on the condition that the player does something to set themselves apart from the other local skaters, so the protagonist travels to Manhattan, New York with Eric, who is on the run from drug dealers after setting their car on fire as revenge for stealing from the skate shop.

There, the pair shoot a skating video that impresses Stacy, who loans them a van and suggests they enter the Tampa AM, an amateur division skate contest held annually at the Skatepark of Tampa, in Tampa, Florida. Upon arrival, Eric is arrested for insulting a police officer, and the protagonist does favors for the local police department to secure his bail. However, when they arrive for the contest, it is revealed that Eric had only completed his own application form and not the protagonist's, forcing a dejected protagonist to try and impress competitors in the pro contest in order to gain admission. After impressing Tony Hawk, the protagonist wins the Best Trick event at Tampa AM and is offered sponsorship deals by Birdhouse, Element, Flip, Girl, and Zero to join their skate teams, much to Eric's dismay. After selecting a team, the protagonist then heads to San Diego, California to meet Todd, the manager of the team, and completes several photo shoots for a magazine. Following a wild celebration party, it is revealed that Eric has been picked up by the same sponsor.

The team then flies out to Hawaii to film a video, with the protagonist aiming for local spots that skaters have not filmed at before. Finding a tall hotel, the protagonist climbs to the roof and recruits Eric to film a trick video atop it. The police arrive to arrest them for trespassing, but the protagonist uses the opportunity to perform a McTwist over the helicopter and onto the awning of the adjacent Royal Hawaiian Hotel, allowing them and an awestruck Eric to evade the police. The team then travels to Vancouver, British Columbia, Canada. After doing errands for locals and finishing their part of the team video, the protagonist attends the video premiere at the Slam City Jam. Eric steals the idea and edits the protagonist's part out of the video, allowing only Eric to become a professional. After angrily confronting Eric, the protagonist enters Eric's pro contest and wins, becoming a pro as well.

After designing their own pro skateboard and signing a shoe deal, the protagonist and Eric embark on a team trip to Moscow, Russia, where they reconcile. Eric gets drunk and joyrides in a Russian military tank. The protagonist hops in and attempts to stop the tank but, being unfamiliar with the controls, fails to stop it from crashing into a government building. Eric jumps out and runs away, leaving the protagonist, trapped inside, to be arrested by the Russian military. Eric then lies and claims the protagonist stole the tank, stating that he in fact tried to stop them. Unwilling to pay the $700,000 worth of damages, Todd kicks the protagonist off the team, much to Eric's delight. The American Embassy bails out the protagonist, leaving them to do favors for locals in order to return home to New Jersey.

Eric, who now owns his own skate company, reveals that he had been planning to betray the protagonist after having long abandoned the idea of "soul skating" (skating for enjoyment rather than riches); after unsuccessfully trying to exempt them from the Tampa AM, Eric stole the helicopter footage in jealousy before finally getting the protagonist kicked off the skate team by lying back in Moscow. Determined to fight back, the protagonist teams up with Peralta and several professionals to create a soul skating video, creating a new trick in the process. Due to the success of the video, Eric challenges the protagonist to one last skate-off, with the unedited helicopter tape at stake. The protagonist wins the skate-off and walks away with the tape while Eric screams at them.

=== Alternate ending ===
If the story has been completed more than once on two different difficulties, an alternate ending occurs, where the protagonist knocks Eric unconscious, taking the tape back instead of holding the skate-off.

== Development ==
=== Concept ===
The GameCube, PlayStation 2, and Xbox versions of Underground were developed by Neversoft, while the Game Boy Advance version was developed by Vicarious Visions the mobile version by Jamdat, and the Windows version was created by Beenox. Activision, which had acquired Neversoft in 1999, published all the versions. Underground was conceived as the fifth entry in the Tony Hawk's Pro Skater series under the title Tony Hawk's Pro Skater 5 (no relation to the 2015 game Tony Hawk's Pro Skater 5), but it was reworked.

Underground was created with a theme of individuality: it stars an amateur skater in a true story mode, whereas each previous Tony Hawk's game had starred professional skaters and had lacked a plot. One reason for only allowing the player to use a custom character was that certain criminal acts completed in the plot would not reflect well on real-world skaters. Previous games in the series had included character-creation features as well, but Neversoft expanded customization in Underground by implementing face-scanning for the PlayStation 2 version: if the player emailed a photograph of their face to faces@thugonline.com, the company could digitize it for use in the game. Regarding the customization options, especially the park editor, producer Stacey Drellishak said that Neversoft was "trying to create the most customizable game ever". The developers used storytelling and exploration to distance their product from the plotless, task-based format of previous Tony Hawk's games, which led Neversoft president Joel Jewett to describe Underground as an adventure game.

=== Design ===
Levels in the console versions of Underground were significantly larger than those of earlier Tony Hawk's games. Neversoft expanded each level until it ceased to run correctly, then shrunk it slightly. Most of the levels were modelled closely after real-world locations; the designers traveled to locales representative of each city and took photographs and videos as reference. The New Jersey level was a replication of a neighborhood where team artist Henry Ji had grown up as a young skater. Neversoft wanted the player to become familiar with the basic game mechanics quickly and to notice Underground's differences from previous Tony Hawk's games immediately. To accomplish this, they introduced the ability to travel on foot, and the ability to climb along ledges in the first few missions. While Neversoft wanted to keep Underground realistic and relatable for the most part, they added driving side-missions as an enjoyable diversion and to push the boundaries of freedom in skateboarding games, but these missions were not intended to take away from the main experience of skateboarding.

Pro Skater 4, Underground's predecessor in the Tony Hawk's series, had received criticism for its difficulty: Neversoft had not realized that each game in the series was drawing new fans who were unaccustomed to the demanding tasks. As a result, Neversoft added four difficulty settings to Underground's story mode, ranging from "Too Easy" to "Sick". Neversoft wanted players to develop skills for higher difficulty settings on Too Easy while still progressing through the story. The company had included extremely difficult missions in each previous Tony Hawk's game; the methods used to create these missions were the inspiration for Underground's Sick mode. Development of the basic gameplay mechanics and structure began quickly but by the end of August 2003, only two months before the American release, work was still in progress.

While the cutscenes are animated with 3D graphics, the team recorded live-action videos to introduce the real-world skateboarding teams, so that players could better understand each team before selecting one to join. Neversoft interviewed professional skaters about their experiences of becoming known in the skateboarding world, then compiled elements of these stories into the script. Every skater who appears in the plot helped to craft their own scenes and voiced their own character.

=== Promotion and release ===
Underground was promoted with a playable demo at Microsoft's "GameRiot" event held at Lollapalooza in July 2003. Activision promoted Underground with the "Tony Hawk's Face Off Mobile Tour", a series of events across 29 cities in October. Attendees could play the game early and compete in it for tickets to Boom Boom Huck Jam 2003, which Tony Hawk himself attended. Activision, which sponsored the October Gravity Games extreme sports competition, promoted the game at the event and used its rendering engine to model tricks performed by the real-world skaters. The console and Game Boy Advance versions were released on October 28 in the United States, November 14 in Europe, and May 2004 in Japan. The mobile phone version was released worldwide in January 2004. This version was distributed in the United States via AT&T's mMode data download service and also by Verizon Wireless. Underground had a marketing budget of $8.6 million.

== Reception ==
Reception

Aggregate score
Aggregator	Score
Metacritic	(PS2) 90/100 (GC) 89/100 (GBA) 86/100 (Xbox) 85/100

Review scores
Publication	Score
Eurogamer	7/10
Famitsu	(PS2) 33/40
Game Informer	9.25/10
GameRevolution	A−
GameSpy	4/5
GameZone	9.5/10
IGN	9.5/10
Official U.S. PlayStation Magazine	10/10

=== Critical response ===
Tony Hawk's Underground received "universal acclaim", according to review aggregator Metacritic. GameZone's Michael Knutson wrote that Underground is "one of the best skating games around" and that players of every skill level would enjoy it. Eurogamer's Tom Bramwell concurred that "as a 'pick-up-and-play' sort of game, THUG is endlessly rewarding" and called it the best entry in the series.

The story was well received. Joe Rybicki of Official U.S. PlayStation Magazine said that, as an extreme-sports game, Underground has a real story with "honest-to-goodness characters". IGN's Douglas Perry called it "a kick, albeit relatively lightweight in nature". He especially praised the pervasive sense of humor in the narrative and in the portrayal of real-world skaters. Knutson called the story "unique" and said that it blends well with the gameplay. Ben Silverman of Game Revolution described the plot as a "silly" cross between those of the 1980s films North Shore and Gleaming the Cube, but he praised it for giving context to the level goals and keeping distance between the skill unlocks. Bramwell called it "hackneyed". Rybicki found that the plot hurt the replay value and caused missions to be overly simplistic. By contrast, Game Informer's Justin Leeper thought that "it serves to make some of the less-entertaining goals tolerable, because there's a reason for doing them".

The aesthetics were generally well received. Bramwell called the graphics "unchanged and increasingly antiquated" and criticized the presence of "sharp, angular character models, eerily unrealistic lighting and odd little moments when the player is trying to turn round and ends up banging into a curb". Knutson, meanwhile, was positive regarding the graphics, art, and animation: he called them "nearly flawless" and praised the realism they brought to the inherently fantastical skateboarding genre. Williams said that "THUG's cityscapes are incredibly well designed" and singled out the GameCube version of Underground as exceptionally well rendered. Rybicki called the levels "big and beautiful". Knutson commended the soundtrack's large size and the sound effects' realism. Perry appreciated the "hilariously hurtful" injury sounds and the extensive song list. By contrast, IGN's Craig Harris praised the graphics of the Game Boy Advance version but was more mixed on the soundtrack.

The alternate gameplay modes were received well. Knutson lauded the high degree of customization; he summarized that "everything is expounded a hundred fold: from create-a-skater to create-a-park mode, it is simply amazing". He singled out the level editor as one of the deepest he had ever seen. GameSpy's Bryn Williams identified the level editor as an "extremely well-designed" feature that contributed to the overall "brilliance" of the full product. Leeper said that each customization mode is "intuitive and user-friendly", and both he and Rybicki especially enjoyed the trick-creation feature. Reviewers for Famitsu magazine praised the story mode, whose open world format they compared to the Grand Theft Auto series. Knutson and Perry enjoyed the multiplayer, particularly the online Firefight mode. Williams thought similarly and stated that "the most notable disappointment" was the lack of online play for non-PlayStation 2 owners. Harris found the board customization of the Game Boy Advance version to be poorly implemented, though in-depth. Despite his praise for the customization modes, Leeper admitted that his greatest enjoyment still came from "seeking great lines" and beating own scores.

The walking and driving controls were criticized. Bramwell claimed that these modes felt "like they've been attached with an old stick of glue that's about as adhesive as baby oil". Knutson agreed, though he praised the novelty of these diversions. He stated that "the Tony Hawk series has always had exceptional controls" and that Underground, overall, was no exception. Perry felt that the feature increased levels' replay value. Similarly, Famitsu reviewers noted that, although the fast pace was extremely challenging at times, the high difficulty provides a sense of accomplishment when jumps and tricks are performed correctly. Williams found the GameCube version's controls mediocre, albeit manageable. Damon Brown from GameSpot said that the mobile version's restrictive controls—many tricks require three button inputs—were that version's only caveat.

=== Sales and accolades ===
Underground won Best Sports Game at the 2003 Game Critics Awards hosted by Electronic Entertainment Expo (E3). The 2004 MTV Video Music Awards introduced a new category, Best Video Game Soundtrack, which Underground won. During the AIAS' 7th Annual Interactive Achievement Awards, Underground received nominations for Console Action Sports Game of the Year, Outstanding Achievement in Game Design, and Outstanding Achievement in Licensed Soundtrack.

In Europe the week after the release, the PlayStation 2, Xbox, and GameCube versions were respectively the fifth, sixth, and eighth-best selling games for those consoles. It would remain uninterrupted in the top twenty of every week until January 24, 2004, for the Xbox and GameCube and February 21 for the PlayStation 2, inclusive. As of December 2007, the PlayStation 2 version had sold 2.11 million copies in the United States. The GameCube version made Nintendo's Player's Choice list by selling 250,000 copies in the United States. Its PlayStation 2 version also received a "Platinum" sales award from the Entertainment and Leisure Software Publishers Association (ELSPA), indicating sales of at least 300,000 copies in the United Kingdom.

== Sequel ==
Neversoft and Activision released a sequel, Underground 2, on October 4, 2004, for Windows, GameCube, PlayStation 2, Xbox, Game Boy Advance, and PlayStation Portable consoles. The plot continues that of Underground and focuses on the player character and their team sabotaging an opposing team. The gameplay, structure, and level design are very similar to those of Underground, but Underground 2 features new tricks and gameplay mechanics, like the Natas spin, the ability to plant customized stickers in levels with the "sticker slap", a slow-motion "Focus" mode, and the ability to earn points by having a tantrum after falling. The plot is set in new locations, including Boston, New Orleans, Berlin, Barcelona, and Skatopia.
