= Jason Jessee =

American professional skateboarder and automotive designer (born 1969)

Jason Lee Jessee (born December 27, 1969) is an American professional skateboarder and automotive designer best known for his stint with Santa Cruz Skateboards in the late 1980s. He was identified as the 24th-most influential skateboarder of all time by TransWorld SKATEboarding magazine in 2011, though was later removed from the list following the reveal of his past controversies in 2018. The feature documentary Pray for Me: The Jason Jessee Film was released in 2007.

== Skateboarding ==
Jessee's first sponsor was Powell Peralta and later Vision Street Wear, but made the move to a professional sponsorship deal with Santa Cruz Skateboards in December 1987. He notably featured in the company's 1988 highlight video Streets on Fire, in which he played a fictional version of himself who is arrested and jailed for illegal skateboarding. After an extended period of absence from the skateboarding industry, Jessee was once again sponsored by Santa Cruz and he helped the company during its 40th-anniversary celebration in 2013.

Jessee appeared in the 2018 film Converse PURPLE, but was then "indefinitely suspended" by Converse in May 2018—during which he also made his first Thrasher magazine cover appearance—after details of his controversial past surfaced.

Alongside other professional skateboarders such as Tony Hawk and Kevin Staab, Jessee was interviewed for the 2002 feature documentary Stoked: The Rise and Fall of Gator, about the tragedy of former professional skateboarder Mark "Gator" Rogowski. Jessee later described Rogowski in a June 2014 interview as a "creep".

== Other ventures ==
Jessee has additionally worked as a custom-car and motorcycle builder, and was briefly a member of Los Angeles–based lowrider car club Dukes.

== Controversy and legal issues ==
Jessee came under controversy in May 2018 when a thread on an online forum hosted by Slap magazine alleged his past usage of racial slurs, hate speech, and Nazi imagery. The thread was later deleted but Vice published an article that month about the allegations, including details of a brawl at a skateboarding contest in 1986 between Jessee and African-American skateboarder Ned "Peanut" Brown, during which Jessee had reportedly called Brown "nigger". Jessee consequently lost all of his endorsements, including that with NHS, the parental company of Santa Cruz Skateboards.

On January 4, 2006, Jessee was removed from a flight and arrested at San Jose International Airport after passengers aboard the flight reported him writing in a journal that had the words "suicide bomber" written on the cover, in addition to his "acting bizarrely" and "clutching his backpack".

He was arrested in April 2019 in Watsonville, California, for possession of a stolen vehicle and an unregistered and illegally-configured assault rifle.
