= Vans Half Cab =

Steve Caballero's second signature shoe offered from Vans

Vans Half Cab was Steve Caballero's second signature shoe offered from Vans. This shoe came out 3 years after the Caballero. The new generation of skateboarders had been cutting the original Caballero into a mid top to help them perform more technical street flip tricks. Steve Caballero noticed this and Vans decided to offer a mid top version in 1992. Long time and current Vans' employee, Bunny Caminiti, altered the original Vans Caballero pattern to the sloped mid-top that is now known as the Half Cab (Style 33 in Vans' non-sequential numbering system).

== History ==
Street skaters were using the original high-top Caballero shoe in their own modified versions; they would cut the shoe down and then tape where they had cut the shoe. The shoe had been re-invented for the first of many times. "The Half Cab has become one of the most legendary skate shoes of all time, worn by an entire generation of pro riders who redefined street skating". The Caballero patch was taken off the side panel and was replaced with the words "Half Cab" and had a picture of Cab performing a half cab, or half caballerial.

In 2005 the Cab low was released as a dual signature shoe between Cab and former professional skateboarder Scott Kane. It featured a low top version of the Cab with a cupsole, unlike the Cab and Half Cab which featured Vans signature vulcanized "Waffle Grip". In 2007 the first Half Cab Pro was released. The differences between the Half Cab and the pro included the outsole, insole, and the use of premium materials. The outsole includes slightly shallower grip pattern, the insole is thicker, and offers more padding than the regular Half Cab and most other Vans and it is able to be taken out unlike most other Vans where the insole is glued in.

In 2009 Vans re-introduced the Cab as part of a twenty-year celebration. It was re-released in the original two colorways offered. In late 2009 the Cab low Vulc was introduced as a low top alternative to the mid.

The shoe is no exception to Vans collaborations with artists, bands, companies, and skate shops and is often released under exclusive colorways by itself, or in pack.

== Features ==
The Half Cab features a two-piece toe cap, Vans signature Waffle Grip, various side panels that were included in the design of the original Cab, and is sold under the Vans Classic Line with upgraded version sold in the Pro Skate category.
