= Stoked: The Rise and Fall of Gator =

Documentary film directed by Helen Stickler

Stoked: The Rise and Fall of Gator is a 2003 feature documentary film by the American filmmaker Helen Stickler about 1980s professional skateboarding champion Mark "Gator" Rogowski, who is now serving life in prison for rape and murder. Rogowski had one of the most popular signature skateboards in the 1980s, and the most coverage in skateboarding magazines and videos for a period of time in that era.

== Premise ==
STOKED follows Gator's life in skateboarding and highlights his rise to fame, his problems with alcohol and depression, and his eventual rape and murder of an acquaintance, Jessica Bergsten, his ex-girlfriend's former best friend. Interviews in the movie include Tony Hawk, Jason Jessee, Stacy Peralta, Lance Mountain, Steve Caballero and Brandi McClain. The film features music from some of the most influential bands of the era and culture, including the A Flock of Seagulls, Butthole Surfers, Dead Kennedys, Black Flag and Naked Raygun, and an original score by American composer David Reid.

== Release ==
The film had a world premiere at the 2003 Sundance Film Festival and it was released theatrically in more than 70 US cities, as well as in the UK, New Zealand, Australia and Japan. STOKED earned critical and popular acclaim, including features in the New York Times and Los Angeles Times, and an interview on National Public Radio’s Fresh Air. LA Times critic Kenneth Turan wrote of the film, "Strongly directed and unexpectedly poignant ... An excellent documentary about the compelling dark side of the American dream."

== Title ==
The word "stoked" is a popular slang word used by those connected with action sports such as surfing, skateboarding, and BMX. It is used to mean pumped up, excited, and ready.

== Reception ==
On review aggregator website Rotten Tomatoes, the film holds an approval rating of 81% based on 47 reviews, with an average rating of 6.8/10.
