= Soul arch =

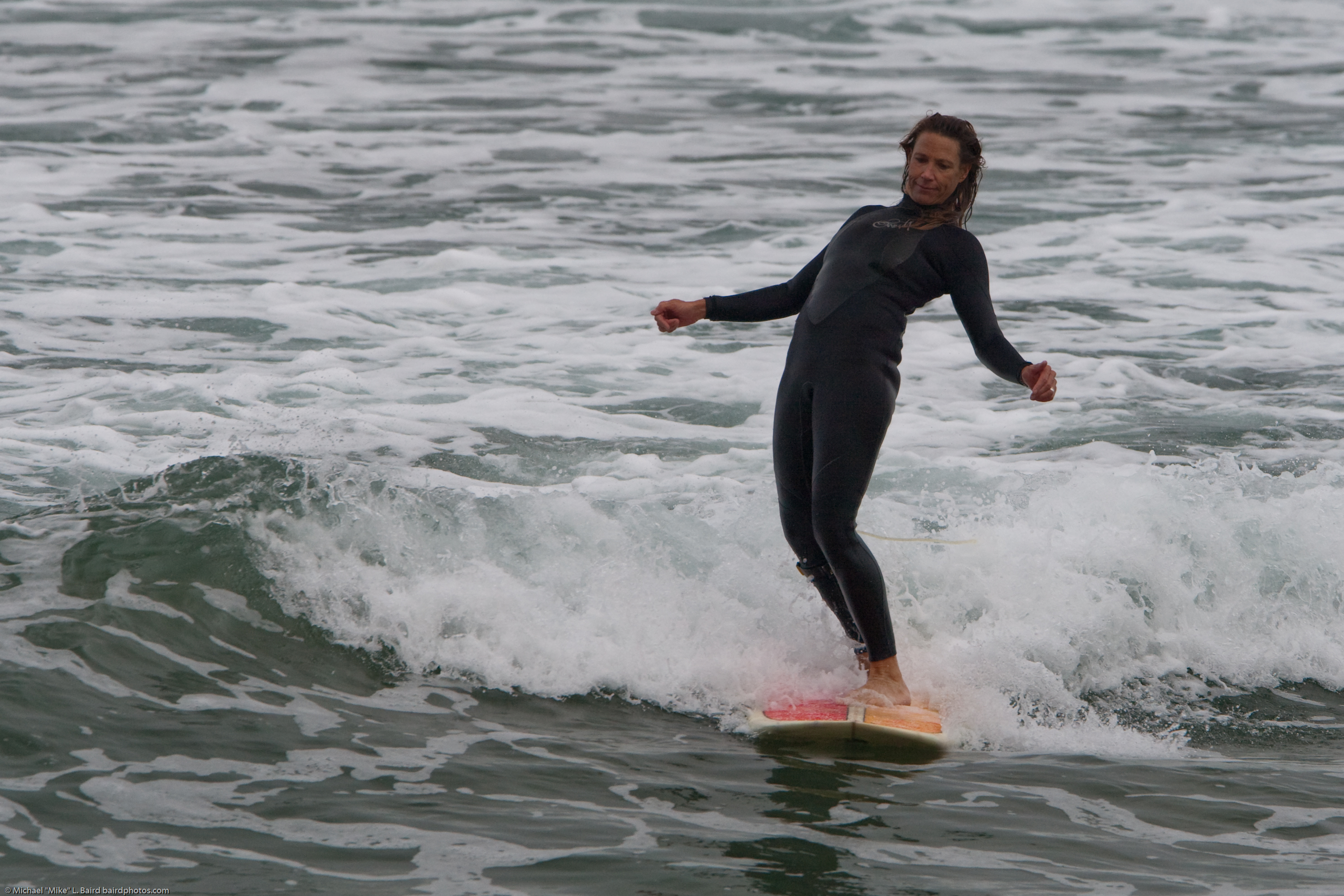
Soul arch

The soul arch is a classic longboard surfing maneuver, performed by arching the back while riding a wave, demonstrating nonchalance and casual confidence.

== Origins ==
As the first surfboards were extremely large, heavy, and unwieldy by today's standards, the soul arch may have been one of the earliest tricks available to riders to demonstrate their style. The 18th century Hawaiian 'wave sliders' seen by Captain Cook's crew performing "dangerous maneuvers" with great "boldness and address" would have ridden 450 cm (15 ft) hardwood planks with no directional fin or skeg to aid steering.

== Development ==
As longboard design progressed, lighter balsa wood and glass fiber boards with skegs allowed greater freedom of movement, while allowing better riders to adopt more exaggerated stances. Arms raised in the air, with the hands clasped behind the head, signified control and balance; this became a common position. Combined with the difficult Hang Five and Hang Ten moves, when a rider positions at the front (or nose) of a board, a soul arch becomes a significantly more difficult trick, requiring a considerable level of skill and balance.

== See also ==
- Glossary of surfing
