= Over the falls (disambiguation) =

Over the falls may be:

- Over the falls, when a surfer falls off the board and the wave sucks them up in a circular motion along with the lip of the wave. Also referred to as the "wash cycle", being "pitched over" and being "sucked over"
- "Over the Falls", the fourth track on the Brown Album by Primus
- Over the Falls in a barrel, things that have gone over Niagara Falls
