= Christ Air =

Skateboarding trick

Christ Air is an aerial skateboarding trick where, while flying in the air, the skateboarder picks up their board into one of their hands and then spreads their arms and straightens their legs forming a pose that resembles Jesus Christ on the cross. It was invented by skater Christian Hosoi.

Danish professional skateboarder Rune Glifberg had become associated with the Christ Air due to it being his special move in early entries of the Tony Hawk's Pro Skater video game franchise, but in a 2024 interview Rune admitted that he "had never done a Christ Air in (his) life".The Christ Air has also been associated with the hit series Skate. In April 2007 professional skater Martyn Jackson performed a 14 ft (4 m) high Christ Air, the second highest behind Hosoi himself. Danny Way has also performed the Christ Air.

== See also ==
- Crucifixion in the arts
