= Helen Stickler =

American designer and filmmaker (born 1968)

Helen Stickler (born 1968) is an American designer and filmmaker, who wrote, directed and produced Stoked: The Rise and Fall of Gator (2003) and Andre the Giant Has a Posse (1995). In 2019, she helped to found a progressive news aggregator, Front Page Live, where she serves as Art Director.

== Life and career ==
Stickler graduated from the Rhode Island School of Design in 1991 and is known for her midcentury home interior design. She is also known for creating political memes.

Stickler's early independent films include the shorts Queen Mercy and the documentary Andre the Giant has a Posse, the first documentary to discover graphic artist Shepard Fairey. In 2003, Village Voice film critic Ed Halter described the film as "legendary … a canonical study of Gen-X media manipulation. One of the keenest examinations of ‘90s underground culture".

Stickler is the producer, director, and writer of the feature film Stoked: The Rise and Fall of Gator, a documentary about 80's professional skateboarding champion Mark Rogowski, who is serving 31 years to life in prison for rape and murder. Los Angeles Times critic Kenneth Turan described the film as "strongly directed and unexpectedly poignant. An excellent documentary about the compelling dark side of the American dream."

In 1999 Stickler created the safe sex campaign "Roll On" for MTV and Kaiser Family Foundation, which earned a nomination for the Best National PSA Emmy Award.

In June 2019, she helped to found a progressive news aggregator, Front Page Live, together with Joe Romm, its Editor-in-Chief, Carl Cameron, Laura Dawn, Sunny Hundal and others. She serves as Art Director at Front Page Live. The same year she published the book Meme Queen.
