= Closeout (surfing) =

Wave formation in surfing

In surfing, a closeout is a wave formation that does not allow a tubular ride or smooth ridable transitional and optimum trajectory of hydrodynamic wave action from drop in to either left or right.

== Background ==
When a wave closes out, a surfer may drop-in from the wave crest and have nowhere ridable to go without encountering or running into wave action falls blocking their forward momentum or pathway. Normally, the term closing out refers to when the wave sets crest and fall parallel to the shore line. When the wave crests and falls across the whole set line simultaneously, this is referred to as dumping.

== See also ==
- Glossary of surfing
