= Mike Smith (skateboarder) =

American skateboarder from California

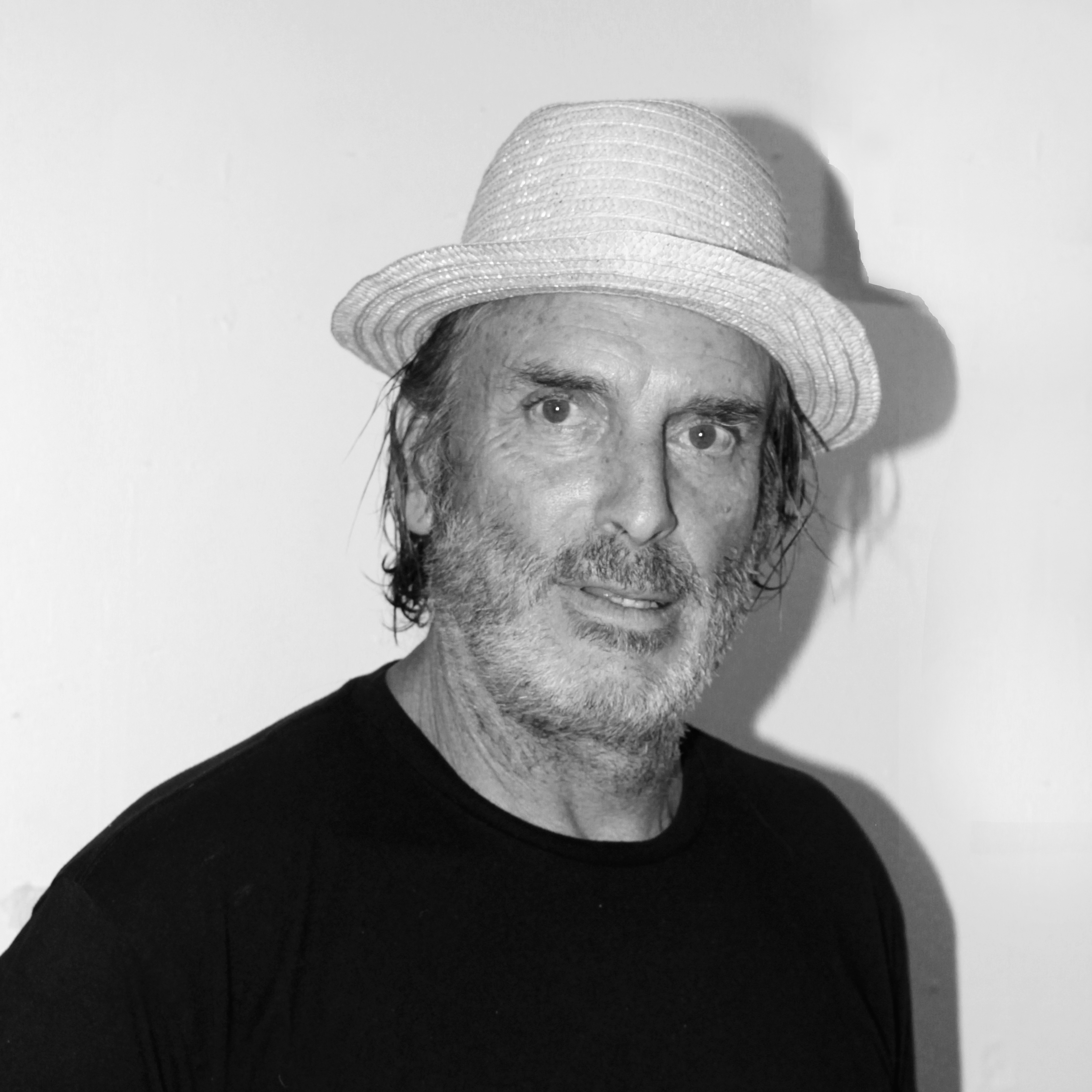
- Smith in Los Angeles, 2023
- Born: 1966 or 1967; Hermosa Beach, California, US
- Occupation: Skateboarder
- Children: Ella Smith

Mike Smith is an American professional vert skateboarder from Southern California. He is also the founder of Liberty Skates, skateboards. Smith is credited as being the inventor of both the Smith Stop (or Smith Stall) maneuver, (which later became known globally as the Smith Grind) and of the Smithvert, a personalized variation of the invert.

During the course of his competitive career, Smith appeared on the cover of Thrasher Magazine twice; June 1981 and January 1982.

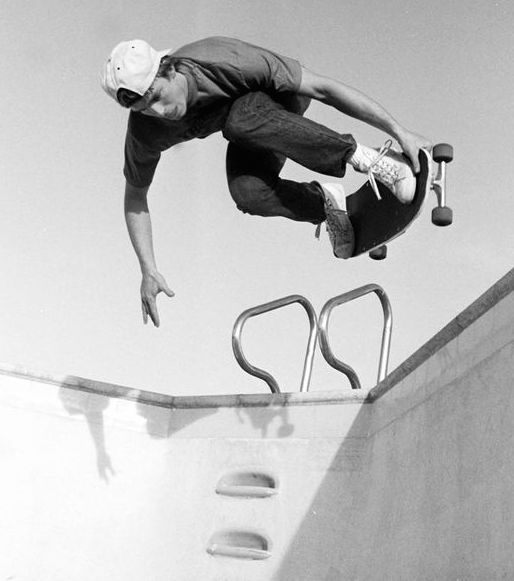
Smith pool riding in Palos Verdes (1985)

In 1999, after years of not competing, Smith placed Third in the Master's Division of the Van's Triple Crown of Skateboarding in Huntington Beach, California behind Steve Caballero and Jeff Grosso.

In a 2019 segment of Jeff Grosso's episodic podcast entitled Loveletters to Skateboarding (produced by Vans), Grosso describes him as, "Smith's bad ass. The guy could roll. He invented the Smith Stop. Mike Smith is one of a kind and is probably one of the most gorgeous human beings to ever drop in to a vertical transition surface.

In 2021, Smith was inducted into the Skateboarding Hall of Fame. In an interview filmed for the Hall of Fame's official website, world champion skateboarder Tony Hawk spoke of Smith, "It was so fascinating to watch him. He had such an iconic style. The way he did tricks just became, his tricks. He did a grind, but he dropped his rail, no one did that before...Smith Grind. He did an invert that was so twisted and turned, almost overturned, no one had done it like that. It's a Smithvert. How cool is that?". In the same video, fellow 1980's skateboarding pioneer Lance Mountain says of Smith, "There was a point in time we all wanted to be Mike Smith."

To commemorate his entrance into the hall of fame, South Bay Skates located in Los Angeles introduced a Mike Smith Hall Of Fame skateboard deck.

== Early life and career ==
Smith grew up in the South Bay region of Los Angeles in the town of Hermosa Beach, California and attended Mira Costa High School (Class of 1984). He began initially as a freestyle skateboarder and later converted to vert skating (ramps and pools). He is considered to be one of the best known skaters from the immediate South Bay area, along with Steve Rocco and Todd Congelliere.

== Mike Smith Duck Skateboard Deck ==
First released in 1985 by Huntington Beach-based Madrid Skateboards, the Mike Smith Duck, featuring original graphics by artist/skater John Lucero, was one of the brand's most popular models. A hand-painted yellow variation of the Duck board appeared in a 1985 Thrasher Magazine ad, however the yellow version of the deck was only released to the general public two decades later.

== Contest Results ==
(note: incomplete list)

- 1979 4th Place Oceanside Nationals (Freestyle)
- 1980 3rd Place (Pro) Gold Cup Skateboard Contest - Colton, CA
- 1981 3rd Place Del Mar Pro Bowl
- 1999 3rd Place (Masters) Vans Triple Crown, Huntington
