= Bailing (boardsports) =

Act of falling off the board while performing a boardsport

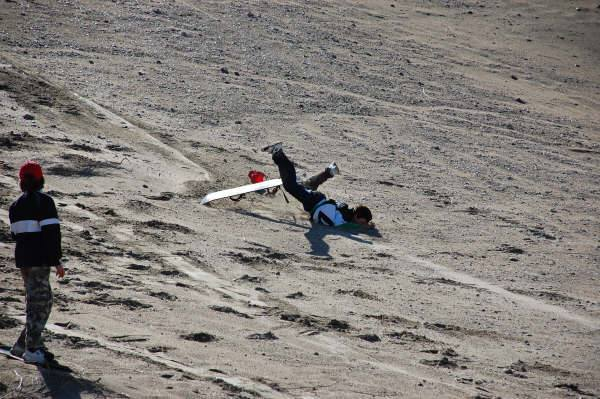
Bailing from a sandboard

Bailing is the process of falling off a board (i.e. a skateboard), losing control of the board while performing a trick in the air, or when the board hits the ground on the deck and not the wheels. Bailing can sometimes result in some type of injury.

== Background ==
Bailing occurs in at least two forms. The first form is an unintentional fall/crash (loss of control) through loss of balance, foot/object contact with wheel, loss of traction, speed wobbles, etc. The second form is a controlled bail, which implies some level of control loss, but is not considered to be an especially painful bail as injury level is reduced.

A third form of bailing can mean a slide (sliding out) or maneuver executed in a controlled and practiced manner to avert a hard fall that may cause injury. Sliding out occurs with the full use of pads, especially knee and hand/wrist protection. 'Running it out' is a maneuver whereby the rider completely steps or jumps off of an object such as a skateboard and runs to slow down remaining momentum.

== See also ==
- Glossary of surfing
