= Hang Ten =

Nickname of sports maneuvers

"hang ten" is a nickname for any of several maneuvers used in sports, especially surfing, wherein all ten toes or fingers are used to accomplish the maneuver.

- surfing: the surfer stands and hangs all their toes over the nose of the board. Usually this can only be done on a heavy longboard.
- basketball: the basketball player dunks the ball and hangs onto the hoop.
- BMX: a flatland move.
- Jiu Jitsu: any of a number of grips, chokes, escapes, or maneuvers which involve all toes touching the mat or all ten fingers gripping gi.
- skateboarding: a nose manual named after the surfing maneuver.

== See also ==
- hang loose
- nose ride
- glossary of surfing
