= Vision Street Wear =

American skateboard brand

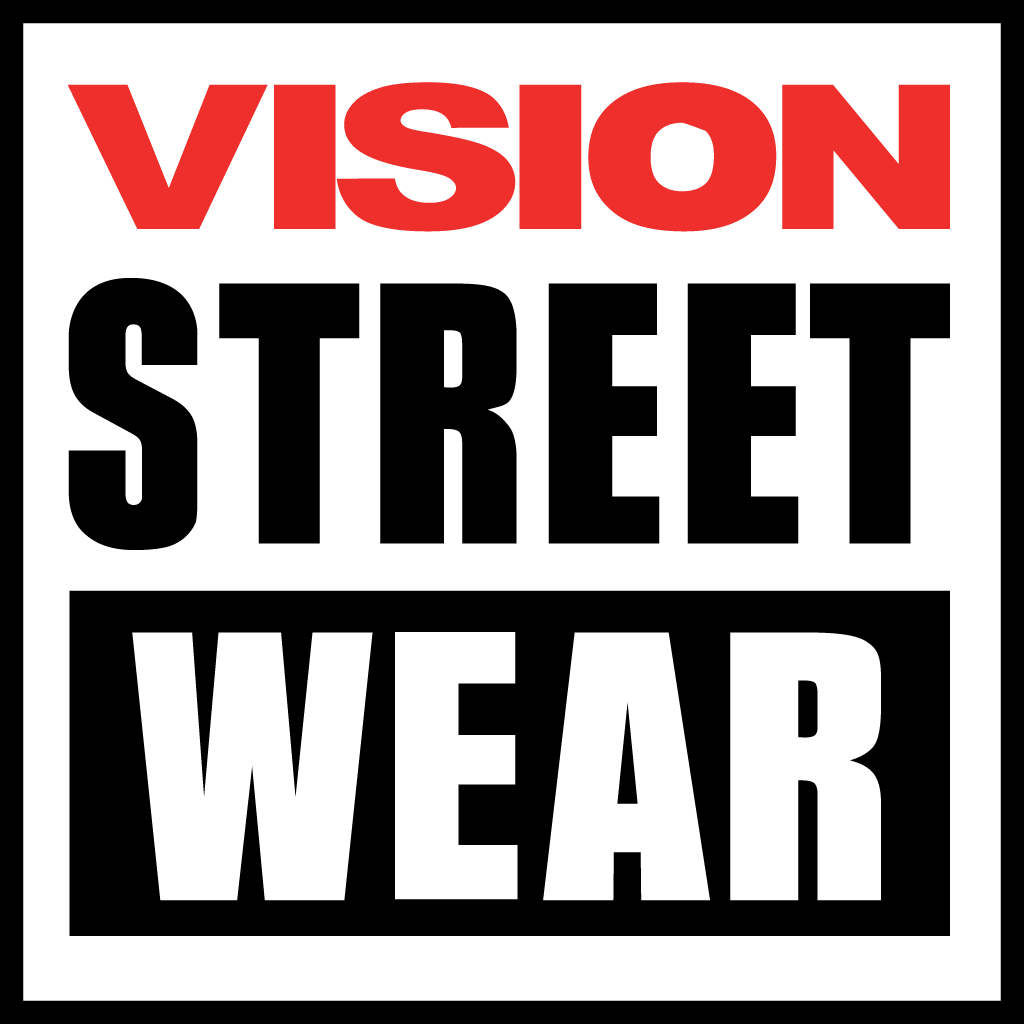
- Type: Subsidiary
- Industry: Textile
- Founded: 1976; 50 years ago
- Founder: Brad Dorfman
- Headquarters: U.S.
- Area served: Worldwide
- Products: Skateboard, BMX, clothing
- Parent: Authentic Brands Group
- Website: visionstreetwear.com

Vision Street Wear is an American clothing, skateboarding and BMX brand. Started in 1976 by Brad Dorfman, the company sponsored early skateboarding greats such as Mark 'Gator' Rogowski, and Mark Gonzales.

Although Vision is mostly known for its skateboards, the brand also commercializes skate footwear and a clothing line that includes t-shirts, hoodies, and shorts.

== History ==
=== Launching ===
In 1984 Vision sports released their first pro model skateboard for skater Mark 'Gator' Rogowski designed by Greg Evans. This was followed by a release of a pro model deck for skater Mark Gonzales (1985) and the iconic "Psycho Stick" (1986), both designed by Los Angeles-based artist Andy Takakjian. Soon after, Vision entered into a licensing agreement with SIMS Skateboards, to produce and market the SIMS brand. Gonzales went on to release a few more pro models with Vision before departing to form Blind Skateboards (a play-on-words with Vision) with World Industries.

=== Vision Street Wear brand ===
With a surging popularity of skateboarding in the mid-1980s, Vision Sports launched the 'Vision Street Wear' brand, making clothing, and later shoes, as well as shifting targeting to include the BMX industry. The bold logo was designed by Greg Evans and inspired by the Frankie Goes to Hollywood "FRANKIE SAYS RELAX" t-shirts popular in summer 1984.

=== Brand Sale & Licensing ===
The 'Vision' trademark was sold in 2004 to Collective Brands, a subsidiary of Payless ShoeSource. In 2009, the company attempted to relaunch the Vision brand with an exclusive deal through Finish Line.

In 2014, Authentic Brands Group LLC acquired the licensing rights to Vision from Collective Brands.
