= Glossary of surfing =

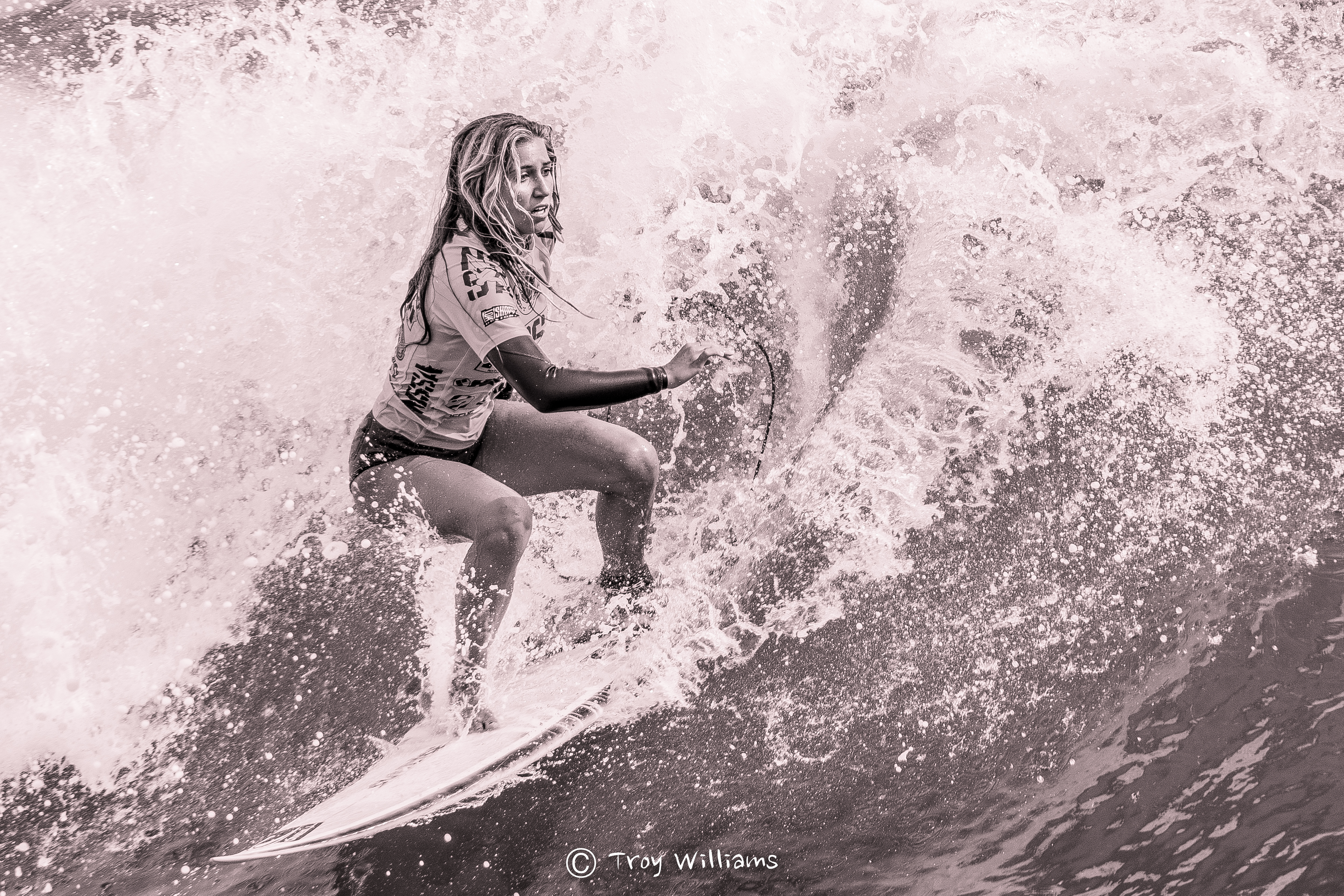
NSSA Championships, Huntington Beach Pier

This glossary of surfing includes some of the extensive vocabulary used to describe various aspects of the sport of surfing as described in literature on the subject.^{[a]}^{[b]} In some cases terms have spread to a wider cultural use. These terms were originally coined by people who were directly involved in the sport of surfing.

== About the water ==
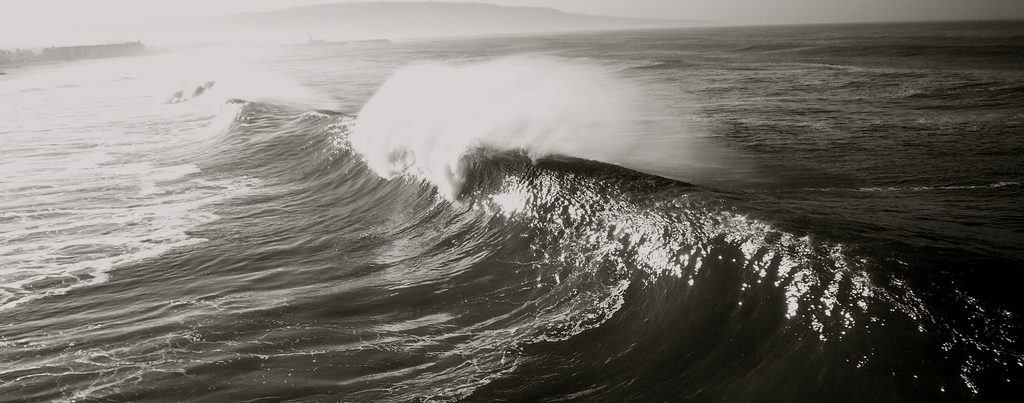
Breaking swell waves at Hermosa Beach, California

- A-Frame: Wave with a peak that resembles an A and allows surfers to go either left or right, with both sides having a clean shoulder to work with.
- Barrel: (also tube, cave, keg, green room) The effect when a big wave rolls over, enclosing a temporary horizontal tunnel of air with the surfer inside^{[c]}
- Beach break: An area with waves that are good enough to surf break just off a beach, or breaking on a sandbar farther out from the shore^{[c]}
- Big sea: Large, unbreaking surf
- Blown out: When waves that would otherwise be good have been rendered too choppy by wind^{[c]}
- Bomb: An exceptionally large set wave^{[d]}
- Bottom: Refers to the ocean floor, or to the lowest part of the wave ridden by a surfer
- Channel: A deep spot in the shoreline where waves generally don't break, can be created by a riptide pulling water back to the sea and used by surfers to paddle out to the waves
- Chop or choppy: Waves that are subjected to cross winds, have a rough surface (chop) and do not break cleanly ^{[d]}
- Close-out: A wave is said to be "closed-out" when it breaks at every position along the face at once, and therefore cannot be surfed
- Crest: The top section of the wave, or peak, just before the wave begins to break
- Curl: The actual portion of the wave that is falling or curling over when the wave is breaking
- Face: The forward-facing surface of a breaking wave ^{[c]}
- Flat: No waves^{[c]}
- Glassy: When the waves (and general surface of the water) are extremely smooth, not disturbed by wind ^{[c]}
- Gnarly: Large, difficult, and dangerous (usually applied to waves) ^{[c]}
- Green: The unbroken portion of the wave, sometimes referred to as the wave shoulder
- Inshore: The direction towards the beach from the surf, can also be referring to the wind direction traveling from the ocean onto the shore
- Line-up: The queue area where most of the waves are starting to break and where most surfers are positioned in order to catch a wave^{[a]}
- Mushy: A wave with very little push
- Off the hook: An adjective phrase meaning the waves are performing extraordinarily well ^{[c]}
- Offshore wind: Wind blowing from the land towards the ocean. This is considered the best wind for surfing because it grooms the waves, creating clean, smooth faces and longer-lasting rides. The wind holds up the wave face, allowing it to form better barrels, and makes for a "glassy" or "silky smooth" ocean surface.
- Onshore wind: Wind blowing from the ocean toward the shore, which creates choppy, messy waves with crumbling lips and is generally considered poor surfing conditions.
- Outside: Any point seaward of the normal breaking waves
- Peak: The highest point on a wave
- Pocket: The area of the wave that's closest to the curl or whitewash. Where you should surf if you want to generate the most speed. The steepest part of a wave, also known as the energy zone.
- Pounder: An unusually hard breaking wave
- Point break: Area where an underwater rocky point creates waves that are suitable for surfing^{[c]}
- Riptide: A strong offshore current that is caused by the tide pulling water through an inlet along a barrier beach, at a lagoon or inland marina where tide water flows steadily out to sea during ebb tide
- Sections: The parts of a breaking wave that are rideable^{[c]}
- Sectioning: A wave that does not break evenly, breaks ahead of itself
- Set waves: A group of waves of larger size within a swell^{[c]}
- Shoulder: The unbroken part of a breaking wave^{[c]}
- Surf's up: A phrase used when there are waves worth surfing
- Swell: A series of waves that have traveled from their source in a distant storm, and that will start to break once the swell reaches shallow enough water
- Trough: The bottom portion of the unbroken wave and below the peak, low portion between waves
- Undertow: An under-current that is moving offshore when waves are approaching the shore
- Wall: The section of the wave face that extends from the shoulder to the breaking portion, where the wave has not broken and where the surfer maneuvers to ride the wave
- Wedge: Two waves traveling from slightly different direction angles that converge to form a wedge when they merge, where the wedge part of the two waves usually breaks a great deal harder than the individual waves themselves
- Whitecaps: The sea foam crest over the waves
- Whitewater: In a breaking wave, the water continues on as a ridge of turbulence and foam called "whitewater"^{[d]} or also called "soup"

== Techniques and maneuvers ==
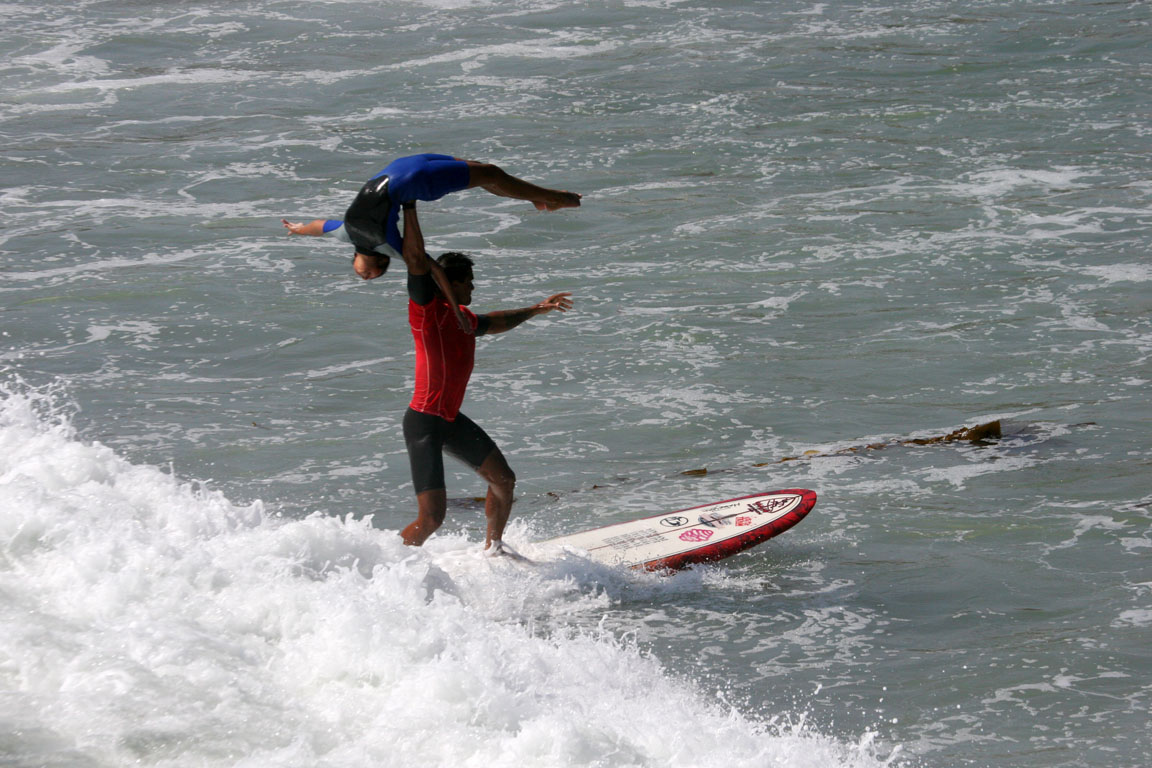
Tandem surfing

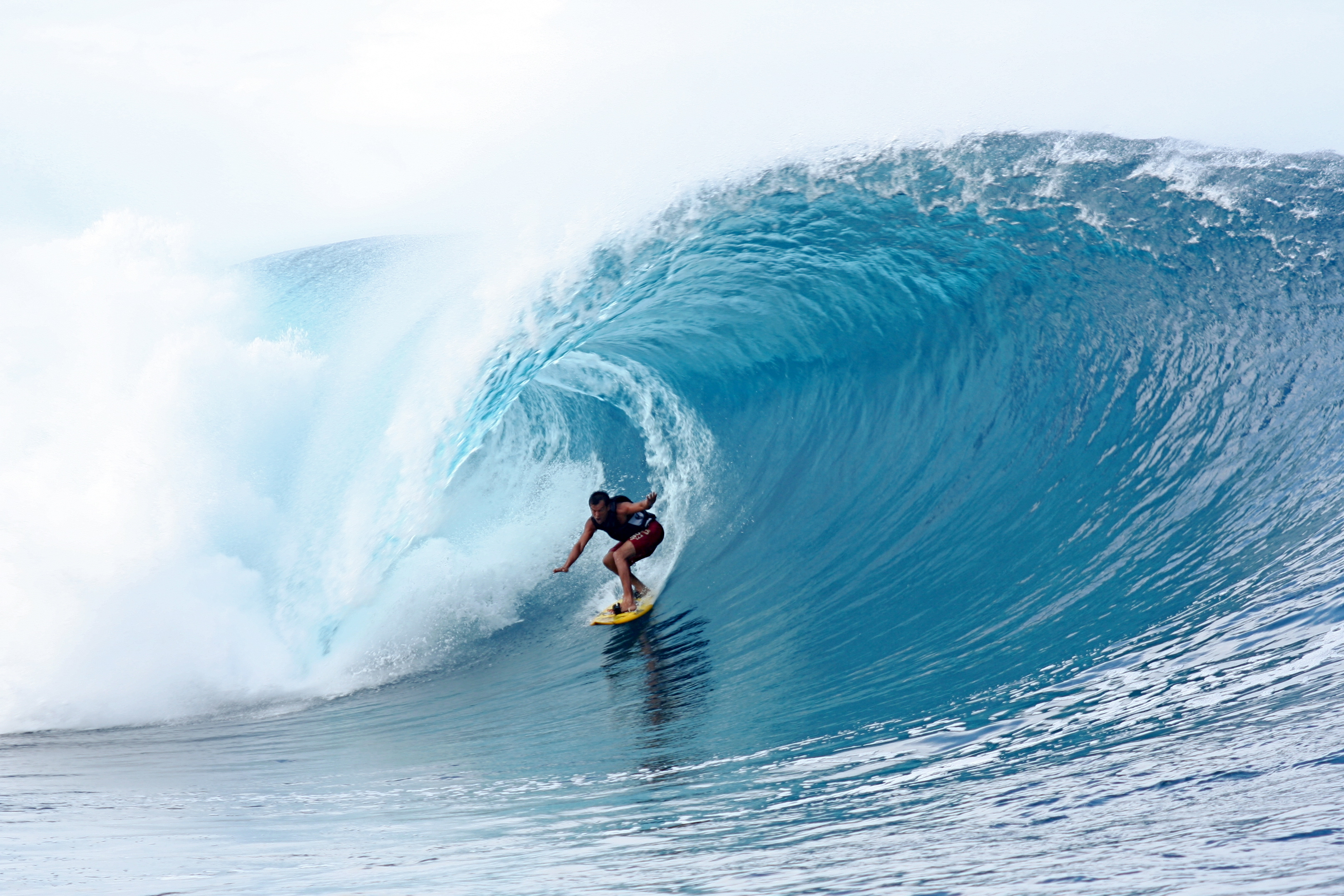
Tube riding at Teahupo'o (Tahiti)

- Air/Aerial: Riding the board briefly into the air above the wave, landing back upon the wave, and continuing to ride^{[d]}
- Backing out: pulling back rather than continuing into a wave that could have been caught
- Bail: To step off the board in order to avoid being knocked off (a wipe out)^{[d]}
- Bottom turn: The first turn at the bottom of the wave^{[d]}
- Carve: Turns (often accentuated)
- Caught inside: When a surfer is paddling out and cannot get past the breaking surf to the safer part of the ocean (the outside) in order to find a wave to ride^{[d]}
- Cheater five: See Hang-five/hang ten
- Cross-step: Crossing one foot over the other to walk down the board
- Drop in: Dropping into (engaging) the wave, most often as part of standing up^{[d]}
- "To drop in on someone": To take off on a wave that is already being ridden. Not a legitimate technique or maneuver. It is a serious breach of surfing etiquette.
- Drop-knee: A type of turn where both knees are bent where the trail or back leg is bent closer to the board than the lead or front leg knee
- Duck dive: Pushing the board underwater, nose first, and diving under an oncoming wave instead of riding it^{[d]}
- Fade: On take-off, aiming toward the breaking part of the wave, before turning sharply and surfing in the direction the wave is breaking, a maneuver to stay in the hottest or best part of the wave
- Fins-free snap (or "fins out"): A sharp turn where the surfboard's fins slide off the top of the wave^{[f]}
- Floater: Riding up on the top of the breaking part of the wave, and coming down with it^{[c]}
- Goofy foot: Surfing with the left foot on the back of board (less common than regular foot)^{[d]}
- Grab the rail: When a surfer grabs the board rail away from the wave
- Hang Heels: Facing backwards and putting the surfers' heels out over the edge of a longboard
- Hang-five/hang ten: Putting five or ten toes respectively over the nose of a longboard
- Kick-out: Surfer throwing their body weight to the back of the board and forcing the surfboard nose straight up over the face of the wave, which allows the surfer to propel the board to kick out the back of the wave
- Head dip: The surfer tries to stick their head into a wave to get their hair wet
- Nose ride: the art of maneuvering a surfboard from the front end
- Off the Top: A turn on the top of a wave, either sharp or carving
- Pop-up: Going from lying on the board to standing, all in one jump^{[d]}
- Pump: An up/down carving movement that generates speed along a wave^{[d]}
- Re-entry: Hitting the lip vertically and re-reentering the wave in quick succession.^{[d]}
- Regular/Natural foot: Surfing with the right foot on the back of the board^{[d]}
- Rolling, Turtle Roll: Flipping a longboard up-side-down, nose first and pulling through a breaking or broken wave when paddling out to the line-up (a turtle roll is an alternative to a duck dive)^{[d]}
- Smack the Lip /Hit the Lip: After performing a bottom turn, moving upwards to hit the peak of the wave, or area above the face of the wave.
- Snaking, drop in on, cut off, or "burn": When a surfer who doesn't have the right of way steals a wave from another surfer by taking off in front of someone who is closer to the peak (this is considered inappropriate)^{[d]}
- Snaking/Back-Paddling: Stealing a wave from another surfer by paddling around the person's back to get into the best position^{[d]}
- Snap: A quick, sharp turn off the top of a wave
- Soul arch: Arching the back to demonstrate casual confidence when riding a wave
- Stall: Slowing down by shifting weight to the tail of the board or putting a hand in the water. Often used to stay in the tube during a tube ride^{[c]}
- Side-slip: travelling down a wave sideways to the direction of the board
- Switchfoot: Ambidextrous, having equal ability to surf regular foot or goofy foot (i.e. left foot forward or right foot forward)
- Take-off: The start of a ride
- Tandem surfing: Two people riding one board. Usually the smaller person is balanced above (often held up above) the other person^{[f]}
- Tube riding/Getting barreled: Riding inside the hollow curl of a wave

== Accidental ==
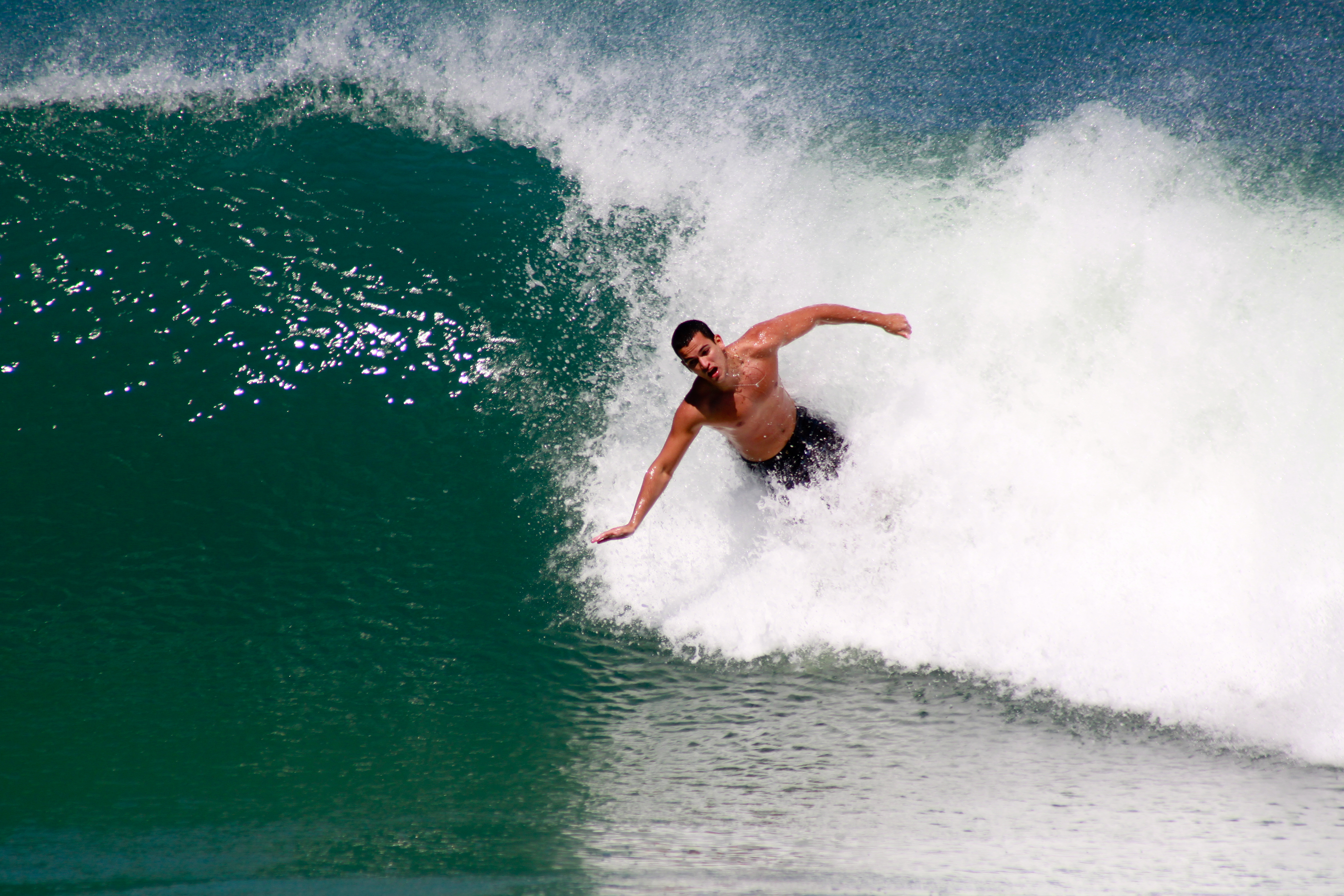
Wipeout

- Over the falls: When a surfer falls off the board and the wave sucks them up in a circular motion along with the lip of the wave. Also referred to as the "wash cycle", being "pitched over" and being "sucked over"^{[e]}
- Wipe out: Falling off, or being knocked off, the surfboard when riding a wave^{[e]}
- Rag dolled: When underwater, the power of the wave can shake the surfer around as if they were a rag doll
- Tombstone: When a surfer is held underwater and tries to climb up their leash, which positions the board straight up and down^{[e]}
- Pearl: Accidentally driving the nose of the board underwater, generally ending the ride^{[d]}

== About people and behavior ==
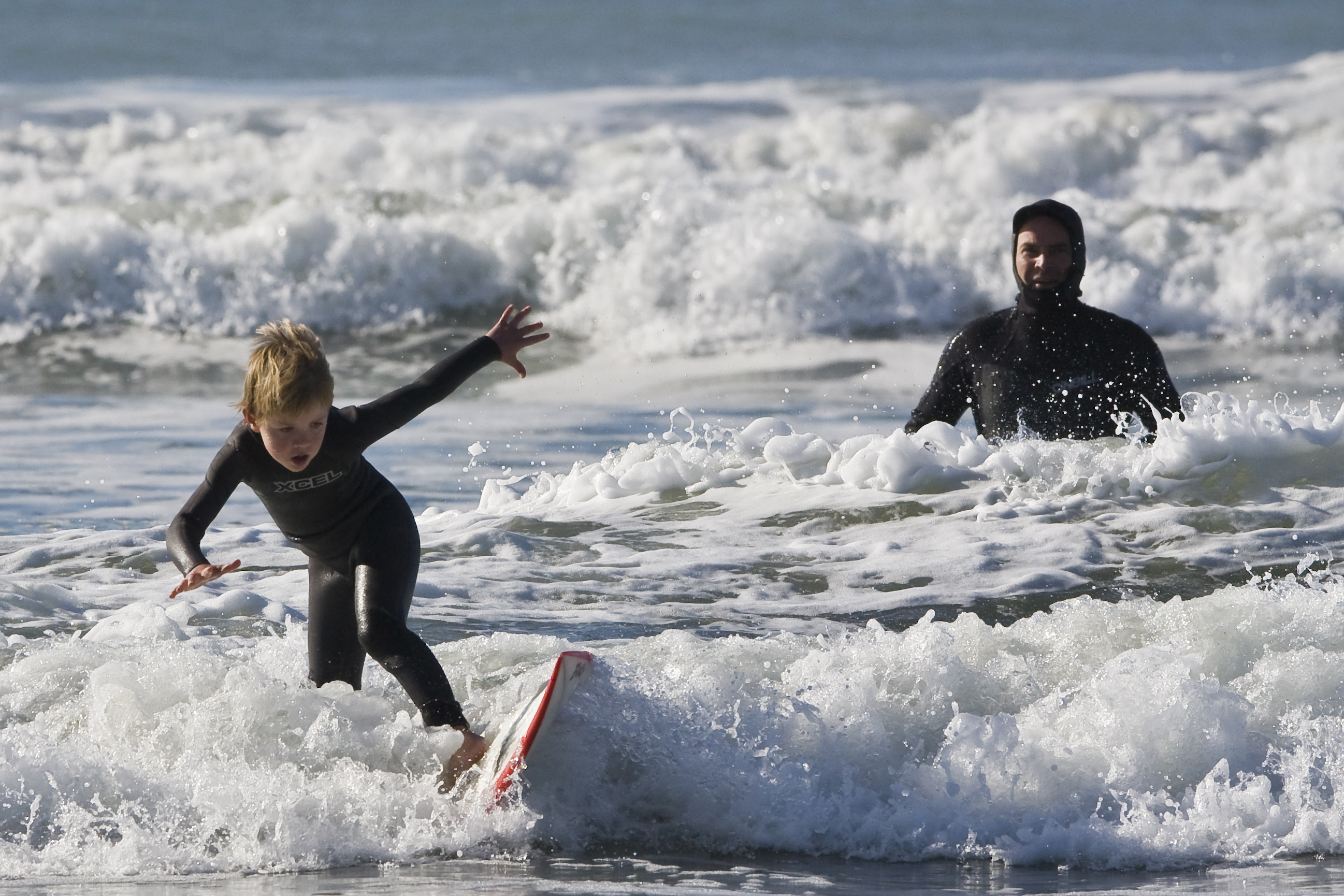
Grommet on a board with his dad watching.

- Dilla: A surfer who is low maintenance, without concern, worry or fuss. One who is confidently secure in being different or unique.
- Grom/Grommet/Gremmie: A young surfer^{[a]}
- Hang loose: Generally means "chill", "relax" or "be laid back". This message can be sent by raising a hand with the thumb and pinkie fingers up while the index, middle and ring fingers remain folded over the palm, then twisting the wrist back and forth as if waving goodbye, see shaka sign
- Hodad: A nonsurfer who pretends to surf and frequents beaches with good surfing
- Kook: A wanna-be surfer of limited skill
- Waxhead: Someone who surfs every day^{[e]}
- Broligarchy, a group of local "bros" who control a surfing spot

== About the board ==
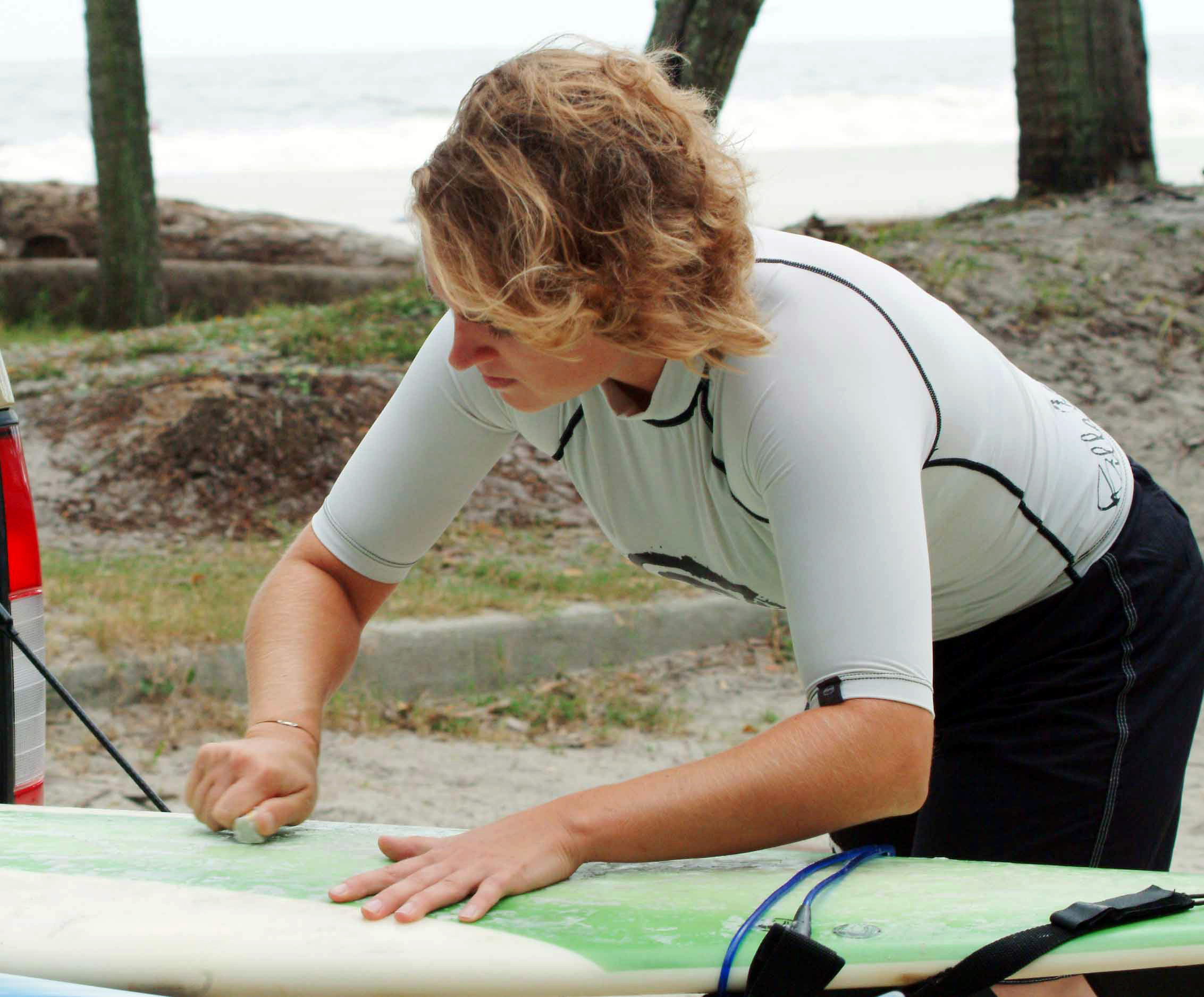
Waxing a surfboard

- Blank: The block from which a surfboard is created
- Deck: The upper surface of the board
- Ding: A dent or hole in the surface of the board resulting from accidental damage^{[a]}
- Fin or Fins: Fin-shaped inserts on the underside of the back of the board that enable the board to be steered
- Leash: A cord that is attached to the back of the board, the other end of which wraps around the surfer's ankle
- Nose : The forward tip of the board
- Quiver: A surfer's collection of boards for different kinds of waves
- Rails: The side edges of the surfboard
- Rocker: How concave the surface of the board is from nose to tail
- Stringer: The line of wood that runs down the center of a board to hold its rigidity and add strength
- Tail: The back end of the board
- Wax: Specially formulated surf wax that is applied to upper surface of the board to increase the friction so the surfer's feet do not slip off the board
- Leggie: A legrope or leash. The cord that connects your ankle to the tail of surfboard so it isn't washed away when you wipe out. Made of lightweight urethane and available in varying sizes. With thicker ones for big waves and thinner ones for small waves.
- Thruster: A three-finned surfboard originally invented back in 1980 by Australian surfer Simon Anderson. It is nowadays the most popular fin design for modern surfboards.

== Clothing ==
A woman wearing a rash guard while surfing

- Board shorts; also known as Baggies.
- Pendleton jacket; popularized by the Beach Boys.
- Rash guard: a shirt that protects surfers from sunburns and abrasion
- Wetsuit: Often referred to as "rubber", sometimes surfers also wear a neoprene hood and booties in cold conditions

== See also ==
- Surf culture
