= Mark Rogowski =

American convicted murderer and rapist, former skateboarder

- Born: Mark Anthony Rogowski; August 10, 1966 (age 60); Brooklyn, New York, U.S.
- Other name: Gator
- Occupation: Skateboarder
- Status: Incarcerated
- Convictions: First degree murder Forcible rape
- Penalty: 31 years to life in prison

Details
- Victims: Jessica Bergsten
- Killed: 1

Mark Anthony "Gator" Rogowski (born August 10, 1966) is an American former professional skateboarder who was convicted of murder. He was mainly prominent in the 1980s and early 1990s. Rogowski's career ended when he pled guilty for assaulting, raping, and murdering Jessica Bergsten in 1991. His life was chronicled in a critically acclaimed 2003 documentary titled Stoked: The Rise and Fall of Gator by American filmmaker Helen Stickler.

== Early years ==
Rogowski was born in Brooklyn, New York, but he moved to Escondido, California, at the age of three after his parents divorced. Rogowski was a gifted athlete, playing little league baseball in his youth. Rogowski started to skateboard at age seven and, while most of his friends were into surfing, he eventually started to hang out at skate parks several years later. In 1978 after 2 years of skating local parks, 12-year old Rogowski was picked up by a local skate team.

== Rise to prominence ==
Rogowski started his professional skateboarding career in 1980 at age 14. Several companies sponsored him including Vans, Dogtown, and Independent Truck Company. 1982, he won his first major contest, the Canadian Amateur Skateboarding Championships in Vancouver, British Columbia. In 1984, he won a national championship. Rogowski soon received endorsement deals from Gullwing Trucks and G&S early in his career. He was the first skateboarder to receive his own 'pro-deck' by Vision Sports, and his pro-deck proved popular and was soon followed by the Mark Gonzales and Tom Groholski models. Rogowski was soon featured on the cover of Thrasher magazine for the first time in June 1984 and he would go on to be featured on the cover of Transworld Skateboarding in October 1985. He was featured on the covers of both magazines again in July & October 1987 as well.

At the height of his fame, Rogowski was being paid "between $4,000 and $8,000 a month" for clothing and skateboarding equipment endorsements. By 1987, Rogowski was earning two dollars per skate deck from Vision, which was selling 7,000 decks on a monthly basis, resulting in royalties totaling US$14,000 for Rogowski (US$ 40,000 in 2025). Additionally, Vision was also selling T-shirts, berets, hip packs, and stickers using the "Gator" name.

Rogowski was one of a group of elite skaters who enjoyed significant fame in the 1980s, alongside Christian Hosoi, Tony Hawk, Lance Mountain, and Steve Caballero. He was successful as a result of the growing popularity of vert skateboarding.

In 1986, Rogowski was detained by police in Virginia Beach, VA after assaulting an officer in the parking lot of Mount Trashmore Park during the East Coast Assault pro contest. At a 1987 skate show in Scottsdale, Arizona, U.S., Rogowski was introduced to Brandi McClain and her good friend Jessica Bergsten, an aspiring model. Soon afterward, he began a tumultuous long-term relationship with McClain—they appeared together in numerous advertisements and promotional videos for Vision, which had become one of the top-selling skateboarding brands of the 1980s.

In late 1988 Rogowski was featured on the "Swatch Impact Tour" of 35 tour dates across the United States, which also showcased fellow pro-skaters Jeff Phillips, Kevin Staab, Chris Miller & Joe Johnson. In 1989 Rogowski also worked as a stunt double on the 1989 film Gleaming the Cube, which starred Christian Slater, and appeared, along with McClain, in the music video for Free Fallin' by Tom Petty.

== Downhill slide ==
Rogowski's popularity declined as 'vert skating', popular in the 1980s, was supplanted by street skateboarding in the 1990s. Vision, the company he was with for the majority of his career, filed for chapter 11 bankruptcy. For re-invention, Rogowski changed his name to "Gator" Mark Anthony, explaining "Rogowski" was the name of the father he never knew.

After a severe accident in West Germany, where Rogowski either fell or was pushed from a hotel window and landed on a fence, Rogowski returned home to Carlsbad to recover. After befriending Augie Constantino, an ex-surfer turned born-again Christian who also became his "spiritual advisor", Rogowski converted to a strict Evangelical form of Christianity, influencing Rogowski's attitude and skateboard deck designs. After four years of dating McClain, Rogowski suggested the couple marry, proclaiming they "can't have sex anymore unless we get married." The sudden lifestyle change contributed to the end of McClain's relationship with Rogowski, along with his occasional bouts of violence (which included his locking her in a closet) and unprovoked jealousy, and she returned to her parents' home in San Diego, California. Rogowski began a period of severe alcoholism following McClain's departure.

== Murder of Jessica Bergsten ==
Following the end of his relationship with McClain, fueled by jealousy, Rogowski entered her home to steal gifts he had given her, made threatening telephone calls to McClain's new boyfriend, and also threatened McClain directly.

On March 20, 1991, Rogowski talked with 22-year-old Bergsten for the first time in years. Bergsten asked Rogowski to show her around San Diego. They spent a day together on March 21, 1991. According to Rogowski, he and Bergsten then went back to his condo to watch movies, smoke weed, and drink wine. He then came up behind her and hit her in the head with a Club, a metal auto anti-theft device. After knocking her into semi-consciousness with several strikes, he handcuffed her, dragged her to his bedroom on the second floor, and raped her while she was shackled to his bed. Afterward, he placed her in a surfboard bag because he was concerned about the neighbors hearing the noise. Rogowski then either strangled or suffocated her and drove the body to the Shell Canyon desert, where he disposed of her corpse in a shallow grave.

Concerned when his daughter failed to answer phone calls, Bergsten's father reported her missing and put up posters with her photo requesting information all over the city of San Diego. While out with his spiritual advisor and friend Auggie Constantino, Rogowski saw one of these posters. Though he did not say anything incriminating at the time, Constantino later said that Rogowski's demeanor changed after seeing the poster.

Bergsten's body was found by campers on April 10, 1991, but it was so decomposed that it could not be identified. Shortly thereafter, Rogowski confessed to his friend Constantino that: "Remember that girl from the poster? She was the one I killed." Constantino encouraged Rogowski to confess his crime to the police.

Rogowski turned himself in on April 11, 1991, and led police to where he had disposed of Bergsten's body. Police searched his home and found blood that soaked through the carpet padding and into the floorboards in two small spots, adjacent to where Bergsten's head allegedly rested. In his confession, Rogowski claimed that he had killed Bergsten in a misplaced act of revenge toward McClain, saying that Bergsten was made from the "same mold Brandi was made out of".

== Hearing and sentencing ==
Rogowski was charged with murder and a "special circumstances" enhancement because the murder was committed during a rape. Under California law, this warrants the death penalty or life imprisonment without the possibility of parole. His lawyer, John Jimenez, challenged the validity and content of the confession. Jimenez also moved to dismiss the rape charge, insisting the decomposed body showed no signs of forcible rape, but the judge denied that request.

Following the advice of his attorney, Rogowski pled guilty to first-degree murder and rape, thus avoiding the death penalty or life without the chance of parole. In January 1992, at the plea hearing, Rogowski submitted a four-page written statement. He claimed to accept responsibility for his acts, but also began blaming outside factors unrelated to the death, such as his previous sexual activities outside of marriage, pornography, and "not following the word of the Bible."

Rogowski was sentenced on March 6, 1992. Five uniformed bailiffs with metal detectors were at the hearing due to a rumor that Stephen Bergsten, the father of the victim, would attempt to harm Rogowski. With the bailiffs standing between Rogowski and Bergsten, Rogowski stated "I sincerely hope that they can accept my apology for my carelessness," a statement that prompted outrage from Bergsten. In his victim impact statement, Bergsten called Rogowski a coward who would "die a thousand deaths".

Rogowski received a 31-year-to-life prison sentence: six years for forcible rape and 25 years to life for the first-degree murder charges to be served consecutively. After entering prison, Rogowski was diagnosed with bipolar disorder.

== Later statements ==
Although Rogowski claimed to take responsibility for his actions while in court, he later attempted to retract his police confession and change his story, placing a significant share of the blame on Jessica herself. In 1992, he told Cory Johnson, a writer for The Village Voice, that:

“The fact is that it wasn’t rape. It was more like an involuntary manslaughter. If it weren’t for my submission to her wiles and the temptation of having such sex with her …I don’t want to defame Jessica at all. I’m very, very sorry about what happened to her. I just want to make it known that I was led into a sexual situation that I didn’t want to have anything to do with...That night, I didn’t realize what kind of a purring feline she was. It’s really hard for me to say these things about Jessica, we lost her and I don’t feel good about that. I just want to make it known that I was led into a sexual situation that I didn’t want to have anything to do with. I was scared I’d be discovered with this wayward woman. There were a lot of kids in my neighborhood, my protégés in skateboarding who would have Bible studies with me. I was being an example to these impressionable kids. For them to see me with this woman and all that had been going on — the wine bottles, the cigarettes upstairs — it would have been devastating. In my attempt to quiet her, in her intoxicated and belligerent state, I had put my hand over her mouth to quiet her for a second so I could hear the voices and the footsteps coming up my walkway. She must have suffocated or had a seizure or a stroke or something. The next thing I knew, I look down and she’s not breathing and not moving.”

Johnson wrote that during this interview he was "listening to a man skating away from the idea that the murder was really his fault."

== Parole attempts ==
Rogowski was denied parole on February 7, 2011. Deputy District Attorney Richard Sachs argued that Rogowski remains an "unreasonable risk to society" and should remain imprisoned. A family member of Bergsten also attended the hearing and requested Rogowski remain incarcerated. On February 6, 2015, another parole hearing was scheduled, but Rogowski waived his right to a hearing for one year. On March 9, 2016, he was again denied parole for seven years.

On December 10, 2019, multiple media reports indicated that Rogowski's parole board recommended parole. The California Board of Parole Hearings finalized the decision, and the case went before the California governor's staff for review. On April 27, 2020, Rogowski's parole grant was reversed by Governor Gavin Newsom, stating Rogowski needed to gain a "deeper understanding" of his crimes, possibly in reference to statements in which Rogowski attempted to shift responsibility away from himself and onto the victim.

In June 2022, Rogowski was granted parole with his attorney citing "the parole board's 'trained psychologist found him to be a low risk of danger to the public.'" This was to be followed by a 120-day review period by the board, and then up to 30 days for the Governor to make a final decision. However, Governor Gavin Newsom again reversed the parole board's decision, ensuring Rogowski would continue to serve his sentence.

As of November 2024, Rogowski is incarcerated at Donovan State Prison.

CDCR Parole Board Actions
Date	Action	Outcome
January 22, 2010	Parole Suitability Hearing	Inmate voluntarily waived the right to a hearing for 1 year
February 7, 2011	Parole Suitability Hearing	Inmate was denied parole for 7 years
November 21, 2014	Inmate Petition to Advance	The inmate's petition to advance his next parole suitability hearing date was approved
February 6, 2015	Parole Suitability Hearing	Inmate voluntarily waived the right to a hearing for 1 year
March 9, 2016	Parole Suitability Hearing	Inmate was denied parole for 7 years
December 2019	Parole Suitability Hearing	Inmate was granted parole
April 2020	Governor's Reversal	The inmate's grant of parole was reversed
June 2022	Parole Suitability Hearing	Inmate was granted parole
November 2022	Governor's Reversal	The inmate's grant of parole was reversed
November 7, 2024	Parole Suitability Hearing	Inmate was denied parole for 3 years

== In media ==
A documentary examining Mark Rogowski's trajectory, Stoked: The Rise and Fall of Gator, was released in 2003 by Palm Pictures. The film was written, directed, and produced by Helen Stickler, and features interviews with other professional skateboarders such as Tony Hawk, Kevin Staab, Lance Mountain, Ken Park, Steve Caballero, Jason Jessee, Craig Johnson, Stacy Peralta, and Rogowski. Since California law prohibits video interviews with prison inmates, Rogowski was interviewed over the recorded prison phone for the documentary. He gave details on his background, his downfall, and claimed to have remorse for murdering Jessica Bergsten.

The case was featured on an episode of Shattered on the Investigation Discovery channel.

== Contest history ==
Amateur:

- Top 5 at the Vans/Offshore Amateur State Finals (California) for the boys 11-13 division, 1980
- 4th Place, Del Mar Freestyle Contest, 1982
- 2nd Place, Whittier Freestyle Contest, 1982
- 1st Place, Canadian Amateur Skate-boarding Championships, Vancouver, British Columbia, 1982

Pro:

- 1st Place, Del Mar NSA Spring Contest, 1984
- 6th Place, NSA Summer Series at Upland Skatepark, Upland, CA 1984
- 5th Place, Terror in Tahoe, 1985
- 5th Place, NSA 1 Houston, TX, 1986
- 4th Place, Del Mar Pro Jam 1986
- 6th Place, East Coast Assault, Virginia Beach, VA, 1986
- 7th Place, NSA Chicago Blowout, Chicago, IL, 1986
- 3rd Place, Vision Ramp N' Rage Down South, 1987
- 9th Place, Vision Street Wear US Skateboard Championships, 1988
- 1st Place Tracker Bluegrass Aggression Session, Louisville, KY 1988
