= Benihana (skateboarding) =

Aerial trick performed on a skateboard

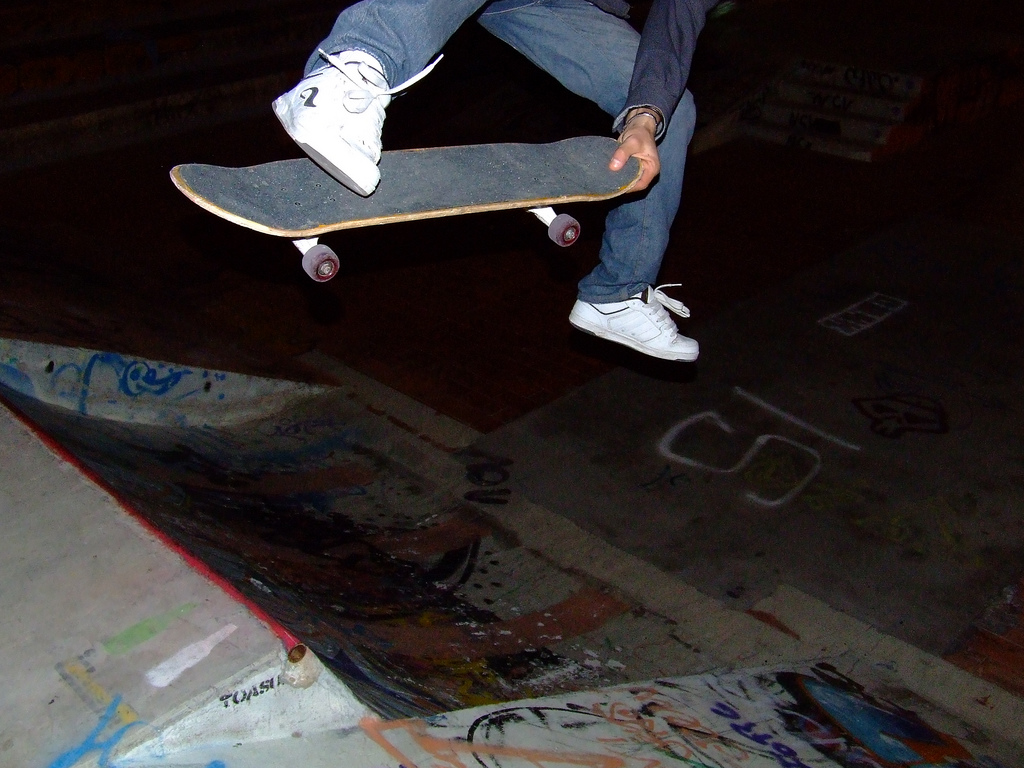
A skateboarder performs a benihana

The benihana is an aerial trick performed on a skateboard.

== History ==
The benihana was invented by Lester Kasai and named after the Benihana restaurant chain.

== Features ==
A benihana is performed by first getting airborne (for example from a vert ramp or an ollie). The skateboarder holds the tail of the skateboard deck with the back hand, while the back foot is taken off the skateboard and extended downwards. The front foot is straightened but kept on the board. When the front foot is extended, the tail of the board is brought close to the inner thigh of the front leg.

The trick's inventor, Lester Kasai, considers a "true benihana" to be one done when the skateboarder performs the motion as described above after riding up backwards (or fakie) on a transition and landing back into the transition facing forwards, and calls the trick with the motion performed while moving forwards a "benibonga".

== Popularity ==
The trick was very popular in the 1990s, with professional skateboarders like Jamie Thomas and Josh Kasper recognised for their proficiency with regard to the benihana. However, since that point, the popularity of the trick has waned.

The trick featured in the Tony Hawk video game series including Tony Hawk's Underground 2, released in 2004.

In 2008, Transworld Skateboarding magazine ran a feature that included the benihana in a list of the 10 Worst Tricks In Skateboarding and described the trick as "terrible".
