= Caballerial =

Skateboarding trick

The Caballerial was originally a skateboarding trick performed in a half pipe, but has now been adopted in styles other than vert, and is also performed in other sports, such as BMX and snowboarding. The original trick is a fakie backside 360 ollie, or in BMX, a fakie 360. The Caballerial can also be done frontside (Frontside Cab etc.) The Caballerial was named after professional skateboarder Steve Caballero, who invented the trick in 1980, originally doing the trick backside.

The Half-cab is a variation of the Caballerial where the rider only rotates 180 degrees rather than the full 360.

== Snowboarding ==
Snowboarding shares many trick names with skateboarding, as frequently snowboarders looked to skateboarding to inform their riding, particularly in the early days of the sport. However, as snowboarding has progressed, certain snowboarding tricks have come to have different definitions than the original skateboard trick. In skateboarding a true Cab or Caballerial must be a fakie backside rotation. However, in snowboarding the term cab is used to refer to any switch frontside spin (a spin initiated with the riders non dominant foot forward and the rider facing forward for the first 180 degrees of the rotation). The amount spun and the part of the board that are popped off of do not matter. Switch frontside 180s and 360s may still be referred to as half Cabs and full Cabs respectively.
