= Christian Hosoi =

American skateboarder (born 1967)

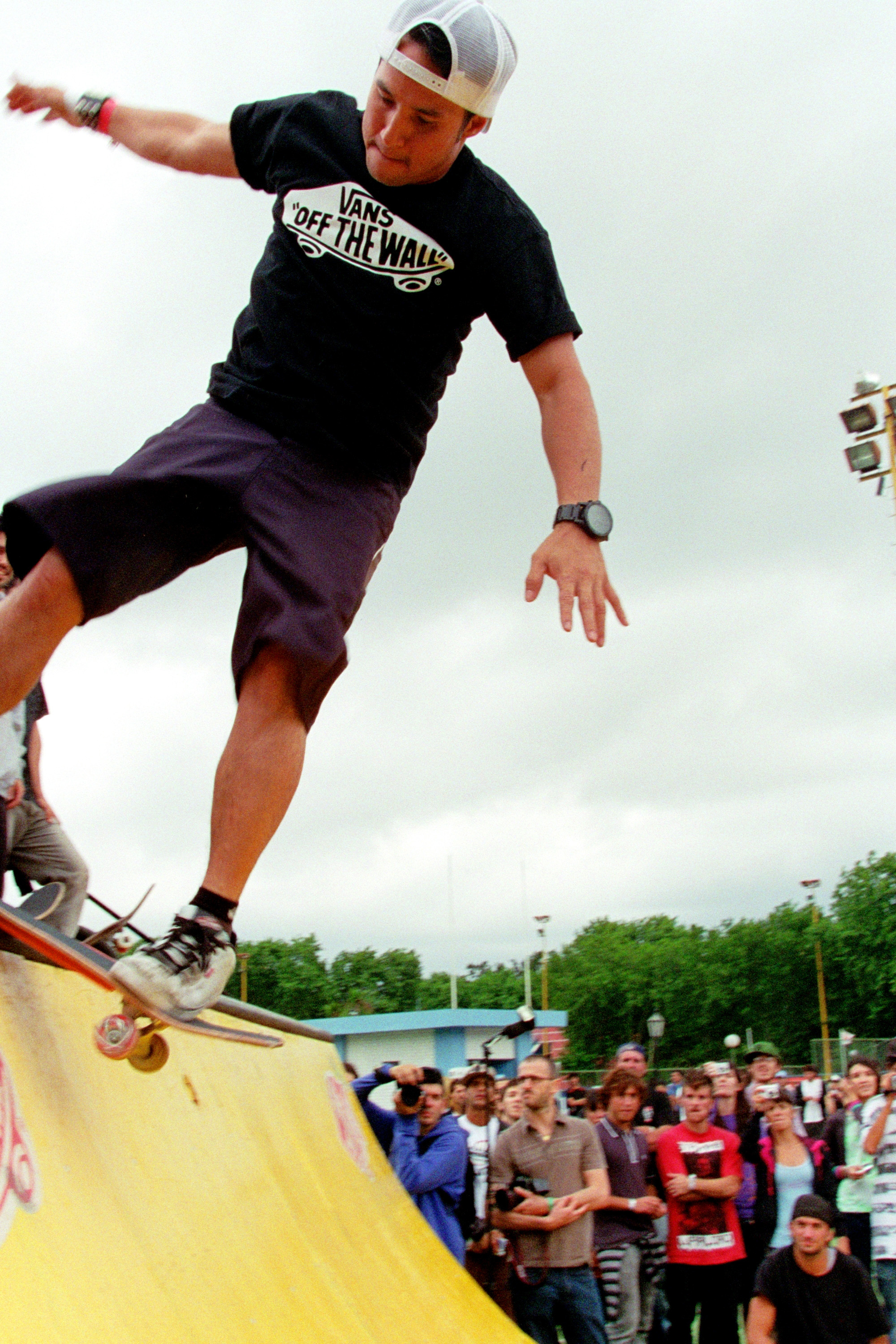
- Hosoi in 2008
- Born: Christian Rosha Hosoi; October 5, 1967 (age 58)
- Other names: Christ, Holmes
- Occupations: CEO, skateboarder
- Spouse: Jennifer Lee
- Children: 4
- Website: christianhosoi.com

Christian Rosha Hosoi (/hoʊˈsɔɪ/ hoh-SOY; born October 5, 1967) is an American professional skateboarder. He is also known by the nicknames "Christ" and "Holmes".

== Early life ==
Hosoi was born on October 5, 1967, to a father of Japanese descent from Hawaii, and a mother of Scots-Irish descent. He grew up in Los Angeles and Hawaii.

== Skateboard career ==
Hosoi started skating at seven or eight years old with veterans such as Shogo Kubo, Tony Alva, Stacy Peralta, and Jay Adams as his idols. His father, Ivan "Pops" Hosoi became the manager of the Marina Del Rey Skatepark, and Christian quit school and spent his time there where he developed his skill.

In 1979, as an amateur, Hosoi was sponsored by Powell Peralta. He left Powell Peralta a year later when they would not allow him to turn professional and joined Dogtown Skateboards. Shortly thereafter, Dogtown went out of business. Christian turned pro at the age of 14 with Sims Skateboards. After leaving Sims, Hosoi joined Alva Skates with the idea of launching his own company through Alva. Hosoi later claimed that he "almost quit" Alva Skates following an argument over Hosoi's allegation that Alva "cheated [Hosoi] out" of the fish-tail board shape, which Hosoi claimed to have conceptualized and shown to Alva.

Hosoi invented the Christ Air and Rocket Air. In 1984, he formed his own company, Hosoi Skates, first distributed through Skull Skates, then through NHS-INC.

In 1985, he launched Christian Hosoi Enterprises Inc., a family-owned skateboard company.

When street skating began to emerge in the mid-to-late 1980s, Hosoi showed talent there, winning both the vert and street contests at the Lotte Cup contest in Japan in 1989.

== Incarceration ==
Hosoi's pro career began to falter as a recession hit the US in the early 1990s and as street skating began to overtake vert in media coverage. Hosoi faced bankruptcy after financial difficulties with a series of failed skateboard companies like Tuff Sk8s, Sk8 Kultur, Milk, and Focus, in addition to a growing addiction to drugs.

In 1995, Hosoi was arrested on two minor offenses, and a warrant for his arrest was issued for failing to appear in court. To avoid arrest, Hosoi stopped attending competitions and demos, including declining an invitation to the first X Games (then the Extreme Games), which was going to be marketed as a renewed rivalry between Tony Hawk and Hosoi.

Hosoi was finally captured in January 2000 at Honolulu International Airport. He was apprehended while attempting to transport nearly 1.5 lb (0.68 kg) of crystal methamphetamine from Los Angeles to Honolulu. He was charged with trafficking with the intent to distribute. He was sentenced to ten years' incarceration, of which he served four, and was released from the San Bernardino Central Detention Center in June 2004.

== Personal life ==
Hosoi married Jennifer Lee in court on June 19, 2001, while he was still in prison, and has four sons, James Hosoi, Rhythm Hosoi (from a previous relationship), Classic Hosoi and Endless Hosoi.

Hosoi became a born-again Christian with the testimony of his wife and her uncle, Pastor Christopher Swaim. He also earned his high school diploma.

=== Ministry ===
Hosoi was baptized in 2004 and was ordained assistant pastor at The Sanctuary Church in Huntington Beach, California.

He has resumed his skateboarding career.

Hosoi was the subject of the 2006 documentary film, Rising Son, that detailed his initial success, drug addiction, and conversion to Christianity.

Hosoi joined forces with Jay Haizlip, Brian Sumner, and others to create The Uprising, a skate-based ministry. In 2008, The Uprising was documented by Steelroots, a Christian youth television network, and made into a reality television show. The first season comprised eight episodes and followed the ministry around California and England.

Hosoi also appeared in a testimonial video on I Am Second, in which he shares the story of his faith in Jesus.

Hosoi along with co-author Chris Ahrens released his autobiography book Hosoi: My Life as a Skateboarder Junkie Inmate Pastor in 2012 that chronicles his life story and testimony of finding redemption and purpose after reading the Bible and becoming a pastor.

== In popular culture ==
Hosoi is a playable character in the video games Tony Hawk's Project 8 as an unlockable and Tony Hawk: Ride.

He is mentioned in the song "Heaven Is a Halfpipe" by OPM: "Like Christian Hosoi way back in 87 / We'll be bustin' Christ Airs until we get to Heaven"
