= Steve Caballero =

American skateboarder (born 1964)

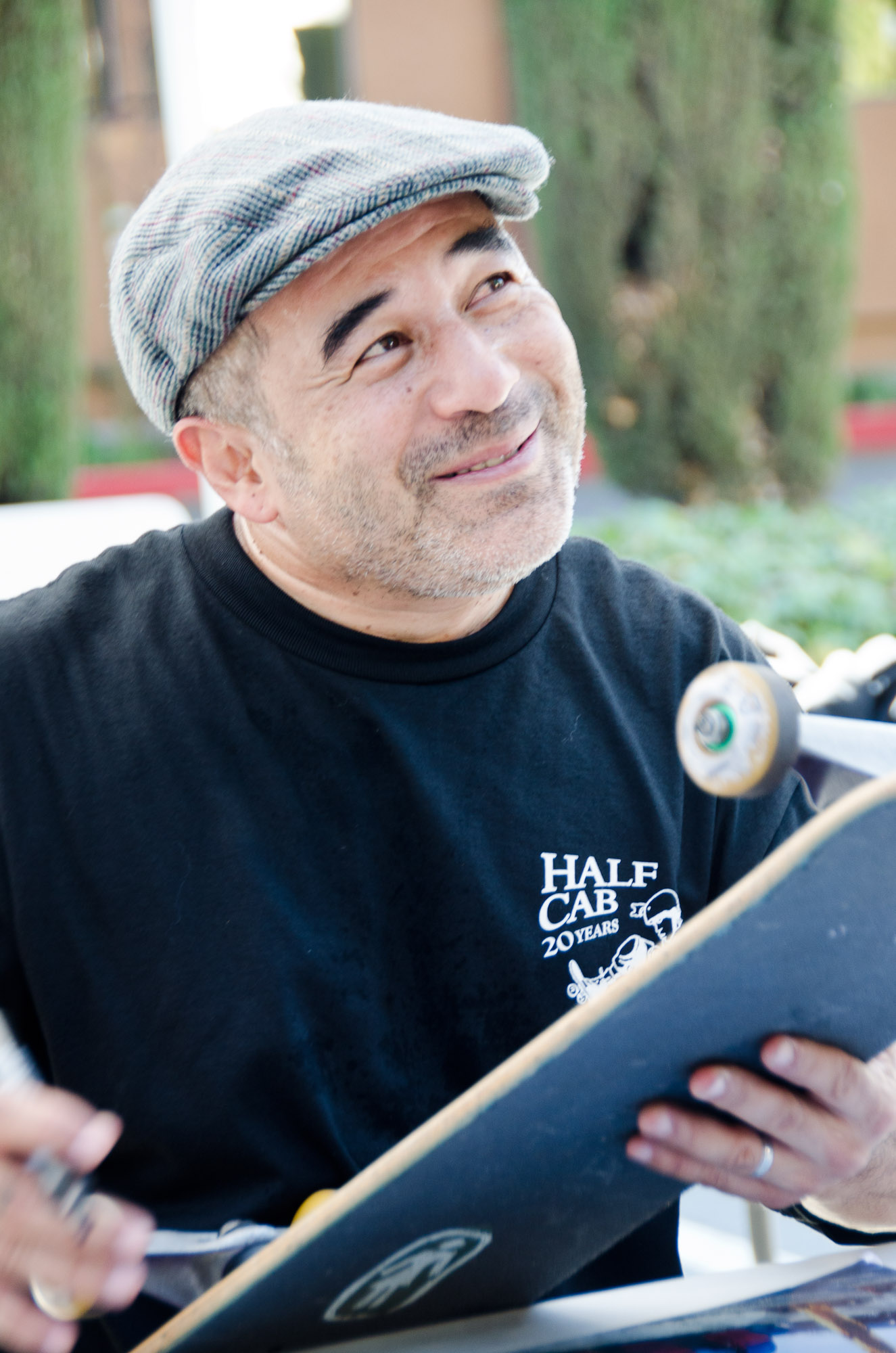
- Caballero at Google's headquarters in Mountain View, California, in 2012

Personal information
- Born: November 8, 1964 (age 61) San Jose, California, U.S.
- Occupations: Skateboarder, musician
- Years active: 1976–present
- Height: 5 ft 3 in (160 cm)
- Children: 3
- Website: stevecaballero.com
- Musical career
- Genres: Punk rock; Skate punk
- Instruments: Guitar; bass
- Label: IM Records
- Member of: Urethane
- Formerly of: The Faction

Sport
- Country: United States
- Sport: Skateboarding
- Turned pro: 1980

Steve Caballero (born November 8, 1964) is an American professional skateboarder and musician. He is known for the difficult tricks and air variations he invented for vertical skating and for setting the long-standing record for the highest air achieved on a halfpipe. In 1999, Thrasher Magazine named Caballero the "Skater of the Century".

== Career ==
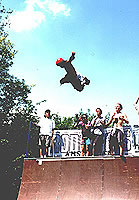
Caballero skating, c. 1987

Caballero was born with scoliosis, a condition which causes a curvature of the spine, although he has stated that the condition "really hasn't affected me too much".

He began skating in 1976 at the age of 12 and started his career at age 14. His first sponsor was Campbell Skate Park. In 1979, Caballero entered a national skate contest in Escondido. After finishing fifth place, he was approached by Stacy Peralta who offered him sponsorship with Powell Peralta. He turned pro in 1980 during the Gold Cup series at the Oasis Skatepark, Southern California. By this time, Caballero had invented the 'Caballerial' (also known as 'Cab'), a skateboarding trick also known as the fakie 360 aerial. Caballero is also credited with inventing the frontside boardslide.

In 1987, Caballero won both street and vert titles at the World Championships in Münster, Germany. The same year, on September 7, 1987, he set the world record for highest air achieved on a half-pipe by successfully executing an eleven-foot backside air at the Raging Waters Ramp in San Jose, California. Caballero's record was later beaten by Danny Way in 1997. In 1999, Caballero set another record for the longest board slide on a 44 step handrail.

Caballero is a member of the Bones Brigade, and has appeared in many of their videos, including The Search for Animal Chin. His current sponsors include Powell Peralta, Bones Bearings, Independent Truck Company, Bones Wheels, Vans Skate Shoes, 187 killer pads, Merge4 socks, and Protec Helmets. His past sponsors included Tracker Trucks, Standard Trucks, and Red Dragon Apparel.

During the first half of the 1980s, Caballero was arguably the best professional skater and featured on the cover of Thrasher Magazine several times. He also features as a character in five of the Tony Hawk video games, from Tony Hawk's Pro Skater 2 to Tony Hawk's Underground, and as a downloadable skater in Tony Hawk's Pro Skater HD. Caballero's most recent video game appearance was in Tony Hawk's Pro Skater 3 + 4, a remake of the third and fourth games in the Tony Hawk series.

Caballero featured in Stacy Peralta's 2012 documentary film, Bones Brigade: An Autobiography, which chronicles the life stories of members of the Bones Brigade skate team such as Tony Hawk, Rodney Mullen, Mike McGill, Lance Mountain and Tommy Guerrero.

== Other projects ==
He has been a member of several punk bands including The Faction, Odd Man Out, Shovelhead, and Soda, and released a compilation CD of the various bands he has appeared in, titled Bandology, through Sessions Records. The Faction's song "Skate And Destroy" featured on the soundtrack of Powell Peralta's eponymous Bones Brigade Video Show. He also had an acting role as Juan in the 1984 Jimmy McNichol action movie Escape from El Diablo, together with fellow skateboarder Mike McGill. In the 1980s, Caballero published a skate zine entitled 'SPEED ZINE,' which replaced 'Skate Punk,' an earlier zine that he discontinued, in part, because he "didn't like the name anymore."

Caballero also paints, collects toys and comic books, rides motocross, and is a hot rod enthusiast.

Caballero started a new punk band called Urethane, who has signed to the Cyber Tracks record label. Their debut album, ‘Chasing Horizons’, was released on September 24, 2021.

== Personal life ==
Caballero is of Japanese and Mexican descent. Caballero was raised Catholic but attended a non-denominational Christian church in Carlsbad, California named Daybreak since 2005. He lived with his family for several years in San Jose until they relocated to San Diego, where the family currently resides.

== Contest history ==
- 2nd in 1979 Winchester Open, San Jose.
- 1st in 1980 Gold Cup Contest at Upland Skatepark: Pool
- 3rd in 1980 Gold Cup Series Overall Results: Pools and Bowls
- 1st in 1980 Lakewood Half Pipe Contest: Vert
- 2nd in 1981 Skate City, Whittier Contest: Pool
- 1st in 1981 The Ranch Spring Nationals Contest, Doubles (with Eric Grisham): Pool
- 1st in 1981 Kona/Variflex Summer Nationals Contest: Vert
- 2nd in 1981 Pro Contest at Del Mar: Pool
- 2nd in 1981 Lakewood Contest: Pool
- 1st in 1982 Pamona World Challenge Pro Contest at San Francisco
- 1st in 1982 Summit V Open Ramp Contest at Nor-Cal: Highest Air and Consecutive Airs
- 2nd in 1982 Summit V Open Ramp Contest at Nor-Cal: Add-On Competition
- 4th in 1982 Pipeline Christmas Classic Contest at Upland Skatepark: Pool
- 1st in 1983 Great Desert Ramp Battle Contest: Vert
- 2nd in 1983 Spring Nationals Contest at Del Mar: Pool
- 3rd in 1983 San Francisco Street Style Contest: Street
- 1st in 1983 Joe's Ramp Jam: Vert
- 1st in 1983 Summer World Series at Upland Skatepark: Pool
- 1st in 1983 Kona/Variflex Summer Nationals Contest: Vert
- 2nd in 1983 Summer World Series at Del Mar: Pool
- 1st in 1983 Summer World Series at Del Mar, Doubles (with Lance Mountain): Pool
- 2nd in 1983 Turkey Shoot Contest at Upland Skatepark: Pool
- 3rd in 1983 Shut Up and Skate Contest at the Clown Ramp in Dallas, Texas: Vert
- 2nd in 1984 Sundek Pro Skateboard Challenge at Kona Skatepark, Florida: Vert
- 1st in 1984 NSA Summer Olympic Series at Golden Gate Park, San Francisco: Street
- 1st in 1984 NSA Summer Series at Upland Skatepark: Pool
- 1st in 1984 NSA Summer Series at Upland, Doubles (with Lance Mountain): Pool
- 1st in 1984 Eagle Rock Ramp Contest at Los Angeles: Vert
- 1st in 1984 Embarcadero Street Style Contest at San Diego: Street
- 1st in 1984 Capitola Classic Street Style Contest: Street
- 3rd in 1984 Huntington Beach World Open Pro Contest: Street
- 3rd in 1985 Sacramento Street Style Contest: Street
- 3rd in 1985 NSA/Variflex Rage at Badlands Contest at Upland Skatepark: Pool
- 3rd in 1985 NSA Rap Up at the Skate Ranch at Del Mar: Pool
- 4th in 1985 Capitola Classic Street Style Contest: Street
- 3rd in 1986 NSA Contest at Del Mar: Pool
- 1st in 1986 Sacramento Street Style Contest: Street
- 1st in 1986 Go Skate Sacramento Pro Contest: Vert
- 4th in 1986 East Coast Assault Contest at Virginia Beach, Mount Trashmore: Vert
- 1st in 1986 Oceanside Street Attack Contest: Street
- 1st in 1986 NSA Expo 86 (Vancouver, BC): Pool
- 3rd in 1986 NSA Expo 86 (Vancouver, BC): Vert
- 2nd in 1986 NSA Chicago Blowout Contest: Vert
- 3rd in 1986 NSA Bare Cover Pro/Am Contest in Tempe, AZ: Vert
- 2nd in 1986 NSA Pro Finals at Anaheim Convention Center: Vert
- 4th in 1987 NSA VP Fair Pro Championship Contest at St. Louis Contest: Vert
- 2nd in 1987 Thrasher Savannah Slamma I Contest: Street
- 1st in 1987 Titus World Cup Contest at Muenster, Germany: Vert
- 1st in 1987 Titus World Cup Contest at Muenster, Germany: Street
- 1st in 1987 Raging Waters' Boomer Ramp Contest in San Jose, CA: Highest Air
- 1st in 1988 Thrasher Savannah Slamma II Contest: Street
- 1st in 1988 Raging Waters' Boomer Ramp Contest in San Jose, CA: Longest Rail Slide
- 2nd in 1988 Raging Waters' Boomer Ramp Contest in San Jose, CA: Lip Trick Contest
- 3rd in 1988 Airwalk Skate Fest Contest at Toronto, Canada: Vert
- 1st in 1988 Tracker Bluegrass Aggression Session at Freedom Hall, Louisville: Street
- 1st in 1988 Titus World Cup Contest at Muenster, Germany: Street
- 2nd in 1988 Titus World Cup Contest at Muenster, Germany: Vert
- 3rd in 1988 Capitol Burnout at the Sacramento Raceway: Mini Ramp
- 3rd in 1988 Torquay Ramp Riot II at Torquay, Australia: Vert
- 6th in 1988 NSA Pro Street Style Contest at Pride Pavilion, Phoenix St.: Street
- 1st in 1989 NSA Pacific Mini Ramp Challenge at Honolulu, Hawai: Mini Ramp
- 5th in 1989 NSA Chicago Shootout Pro Street Style Contest: Street
- 9th in 1989 NSA Vans Jam Contest: Vert
- 7th in 1989 NSA Pro Finals at St. Pete, Florida: Street
- 4th in 1989 NSA Pro Finals at St. Pete, Florida: Vert
- 5th in 1990 NSA Street Style Shootout Contest at Honolulu, Hawai: Street
- 5th in 1990 NSA Backyard Series at Visalla, California: Vert
- 3rd in 1990 NSA Pro Mini Ramp Contest at San Jose: Mini Ramp
- 1st in 1991 NSA North of the Border Contest at Santa Ana: Vert
- 6th in 1991 NSA Pow Wow Street Style Contest at Powell Peralta's Skatezone: Street
- 2nd in 1991 NSA Capitol Burnout Contest at Sacramento, California: Vert
- 6th in 1991 Titus World Cup Contest at Muenster, Germany: Street
- 3rd in 1991 Titus World Cup Contest at Muenster, Germany: Vert
- 1st in 1991 Holy Masters Skate Contest at Le Grand Bornand, France: Highest Air
- 2nd in 1991 Holy Masters Skate Contest at Le Grand Bornand, France: Vert
- 4th in 1991 Holy Masters Skate Contest at Le Grand Bornand, France: Street
- 3rd in 1991 NSA Mini Ramp Contest at San Jose: Vert
- 3rd in 1992 NSA Pow Wow Street Style Contest at Powell Peralta's Skatezone: Street
- 9th in 1992 PSL Transitions Pro Street Contest at Los Angeles: Street
- 2nd in 1992 PSL Pro Contest at San Jose Skatepark: Street
- 9th in 1993 NSA Pro Finals Fat City Jam Daily Grind at Sacramento, California: Vert
- 5th in 1994 Pro Street Style Contest at Vancouver, BC: Street
- 6th in 1995 X Games at Newport, Rhode Island: Street
- 9th in 1999 X Games at Pier 30 & 32, San Francisco, California: Street

All contest results are covered in Thrasher Magazine and can be checked at the Thrasher Magazine Archives.

== See also ==
- Vans Half Cab
