= Stephen Hill (entrepreneur) =

Australian skateboarder (born 1962)

Stephen Hill OAM
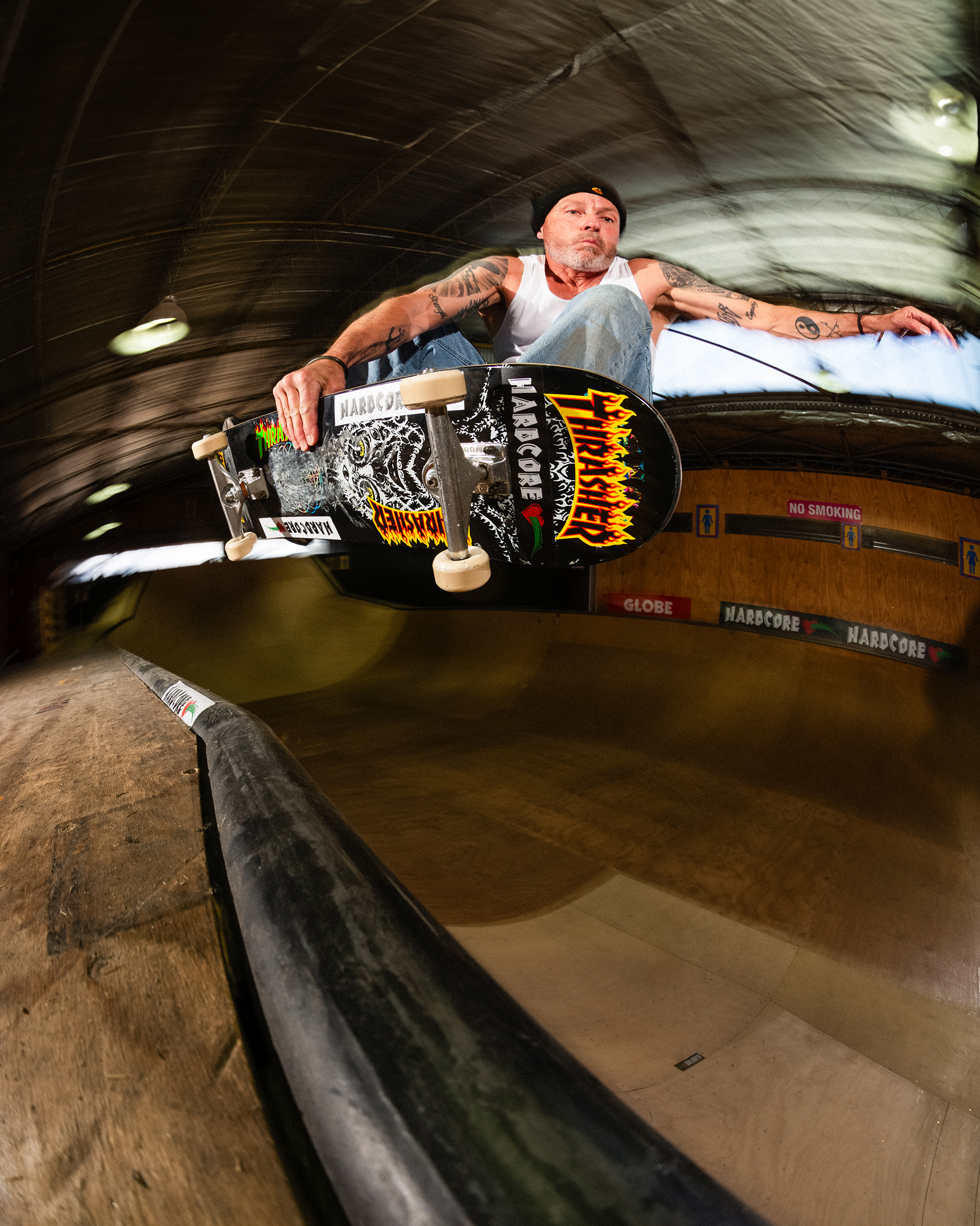
- Stephen Hill in 2023
- Born: 1962 (age 62–63); Melbourne, Australia
- Occupation: Skateboarder
- Title: Executive director & Founder, Globe International
- Website: globecorporate.com

Stephen Hill OAM DLitt (honoris causa) (born 1962) is an Australian skateboarder and businessman. In 2025 he was awarded a Doctor of Letters by La Trobe University. He is the cofounder of Globe International with his brother Peter. He has also acted as an executive producer on over 30 international media projects including feature films and television specials. Hill has also been involved in several community action projects including promoting new skateboarding facilities and local environmental causes across several countries.

== Career ==
Born 1962, in Melbourne, Hill started skateboarding at age eight with his brother Peter in the early 1970s. In their teenage years, they put together one of the early Australian sponsored skate teams, Sparx, were in the Nike skateboard team in 1979 and competed successfully in Australian skate titles.

Along with their younger brother, Matt Hill, they began to import skateboards and associated equipment, eventually forming Hardcore Distribution, a company that later grew into Globe International. In the 1980s, the brothers promoted skateboarding in Australia, running demonstrations and tours featuring local and American skateboarders including Allen Losi, Mark Gonzales, Christian Hosoi, Tony Hawk, Lance Mountain, Lee Ralph, Jeff Phillips and Jason Lee. They also distributed Vision Streetwear and Airwalk shoes.

Stephen and Peter wrote two books on skateboarding, The Skateboard Book: Blast! (1986) and Skate Hard (1988). The design plans from those two books influenced the construction of Australian skateparks and ramps for the following decade. In 1987, the brothers were profiled on a segment on Australian skateboarding on 60 Minutes. In that same year, they co-founded an Australian skateboarding magazine, 540. Stephen and his brother were also early snowboarders in Australia and successfully lobbied for snowboarders' access to Australian snow fields.

Stephen and Peter's private company, Globe, grew throughout the 1990s, and they also licensed major streetwear labels Mossimo, Stüssy, Eckō Unltd., Freshjive, Split, Hardcore Jeans and Paul Frank Industries, along with creating their own proprietary brands, including Mooks and M-ONE-11. In 2001, Stephen oversaw the public float of the company on the Australian Stock Exchange with his brothers, maintaining a large shareholding and subsequently appointed to the board as an executive director. Stephen remained actively involved in product development and brand creation, as well as development and positioning for the company as it expanded into North America, Europe and Asia.

Along with his brothers, Stephen also founded Whyte House Entertainment, a multimedia company based in Australia and Los Angeles in 1997, where he acted as an executive producer on all titles produced. In 1999, Stephen produced Tic Tac 2 Heelflip: Australia’s Skateboarding History, which played at film festivals, broadcast on national television and was released on Home entertainment formats. Stephen was also an executive producer on Love the Beast, a feature documentary featuring Eric Bana released theatrically in Australia in 2009. Hill has executive produced the award-winning surf short film Electric Blue Heaven (2012) and most recently, Dark Hollow (2021).

Stephen was the founder of the Globe World Cup Skateboarding event, a professional skateboarding competition held annually in Melbourne at the Rod Laver Arena, which ran during February from 2002 through to 2006, along with the Gallaz Girls Street Jam series. The Hill brothers featured in the book, Unemployable: 30 Years of Hardcore, Skate and Street released for the 30th anniversary of the Globe and Hardcore companies in 2015. Hill has also been involved in with several community action projects including promoting new and improved skate parks and the Bayside Transport Action Group to reduce heavy truck traffic along Melbourne’s Beach Road.

== Personal life ==
Along with his brother, Peter, Stephen Hill has been listed in BRW Rich 200 list since 2001. Stephen Hill lives in Los Angeles, Fiji and Melbourne, skating, surfing and snowboarding regularly. In 2023 Hill was awarded the Medal of the Order of Australia for service to the skateboarding industry, and in 2025 he was awarded a Doctor of Letters by La Trobe University.

== Filmography ==
- 1998 Canvas: The Skateboarding Documentary (television documentary) Executive Producer
- 2000/1 The Heist (feature film) Executive Producer
- 2001 Opinion (video documentary) Executive Producer
- 2001 Tic Tac 2 Heelflip (television documentary) Producer
- 2001 Down and Out with the Dolls (feature film) Executive Producer
- 2002 Globe World Cup Skateboarding (TV movie) (producer)
- 2002 AKA: Girl Skater (documentary) Executive Producer
- 2003 The Globe World Cup Skateboarding (TV movie) Executive Producer
- 2004 AKA: Girl Surfer (TV documentary) Executive Producer
- 2004 The Globe World Cup Skateboarding (TV movie) Executive Producer
- 2004 Somewhere, Anywhere, Everywhere (surf video) Executive Producer
- 2004 Almost: Round Three (skate video) Executive Producer
- 2005 Globe Wildcard Skateboarding (TV movie) Executive Producer
- 2005 The Globe World Cup Skateboarding (TV movie) Executive Producer
- 2005 What If? (skate video) Executive Producer
- 2005 Globe WCT Fiji (TV movie) Executive Producer
- 2006 The Global Assault!!! (TV movie) Executive Producer
- 2006 Secret Machine (surf video) Executive Producer
- 2006 2006 Globe WCT FIJI (video documentary) Executive Producer
- 2007 United by Fate 2 (TV movie) Executive Producer
- 2007 The Man Who Souled the World (feature documentary) Executive Producer
- 2007 Money for Blood (TV documentary) Executive Producer
- 2007 Inaugural Hobgood Challenge (documentary) Executive Producer
- 2007 United by Fate 1 (TV movie) Executive Producer
- 2008 United by Fate 4 (TV movie) Executive Producer
- 2008 Slaughter at the Opera (TV movie) Executive Producer
- 2008 United by Fate 3 (TV movie) Executive Producer
- 2008 New Emissions of Light and Sound (video documentary) Producer
- 2009 Love the Beast (documentary) Executive Producer
- 2009 2008 Globe Pro Fiji (TV movie) Executive Producer
- 2009 United by Fate 5 (TV movie) Executive Producer
- 2010 United by Fate 6 (TV movie) Executive Producer
- 2011 Year Zero (surf video) Executive Producer
- 2012 Electric Blue Heaven (surf video) Executive Producer
- 2014 Strange Rumblings in Shangri-LA (surf video) Executive Producer
- 2017 Cult of Freedom (surf video series) Executive Producer
- 2021 Dark Hollow (surf video) Executive Producer
- 2021 Garage Dreams (TV Series) Executive Producer
- 2024 Conquering Skin Cancer (Documentary) Self
- 2025 Barefoot: the Lee Ralph Story (Web Series) Self
