= Jaime Reyes (skateboarder) =

American skateboarder

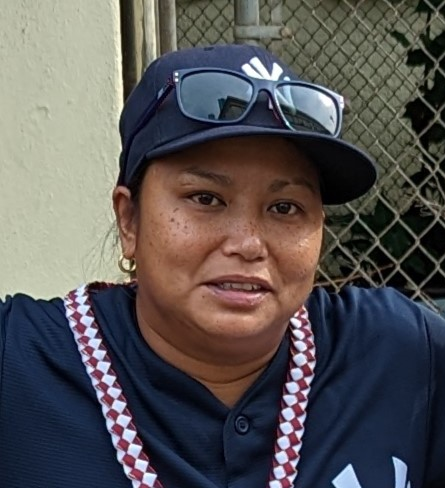
- Reyes in 2022

Personal information
- Born: Oahu, Hawaii, U.S.

Sport
- Country: United States
- Sport: Skateboarding

Jaime Reyes is a goofy-footed American skateboarder from Hawaii. Reyes is a pioneer in women's street skating. As of 2020, Reyes is one of only three women to grace the cover of Thrasher Magazine and has been inducted into the Skateboarding Hall of Fame.

== Skateboarding ==
=== Early life ===
Growing up in Hawaii in the early 1990s, Reyes was an avid surfer. At age 13, Reyes cut class one day to go to the beach to surf; however, there were no waves, so Reyes wandered around and ran into a group of skateboarders. Amazed by the skateboarding, Reyes befriended the skaters. She rode a skateboard for the first time that day.

=== Skateboarding career ===
Reyes' first competition was hosted by the Real skateboard team at A'Ala Park. Reyes, the only girl at the event, won first place for her age group. After the event, Real began flowing Reyes boards. During her early competitive career, Reyes was often one of few women competing alongside Elissa Steamer and Lauren Mollica.

Reyes got the cover of Thrasher in April 1994. In the years that came, Reyes obtained many nationwide sponsorship deals throughout her career including Real Skateboards, Alphanumeric, Rookie, Evian Water, Bones Swiss Bearings, Supreme, In4mation, Globe and Venture.

In 2019, Reyes released a signature deck with the skate company Together Together. The “chosen ohana” model features artwork by Mark Oblow. Reyes was inducted into the Skateboarding Hall of Fame in May, 2025.

==== Thrasher magazine cover ====
Jaime Reyes graced the cover of the April 1994 issue of Thrasher magazine. She was the second woman after Cara-Beth Burnside and also the first person of color and the first street skater to appear on the cover of Thrasher. The cover was her first time being published in a skate magazine. Jim Thiebaud, Tommy Guerrero, and Ruben Orkin set her up with a photographer. Reyes cut class to shoot with the photographer. Two months later, the photo was published on the cover of Thrasher. A copy of her cover is in the Smithsonian National Museum of American History collection.

==== Skate Video Parts ====
Skate Video Parts	Year
Sponsor Me - Thrasher	1994
Feats - Thrasher	1994
Donut Duty - Thrasher	1995
911 - Thrasher	1995
411VM #11	1995
Ride On - Deluxe - Deluxe Distribution	1995
Non-Fiction - Real skateboards	1996
411VM #29	1998
411VM #31	1998
Heads - Zoo York	1999
Logic Issue #2	1999
411VM - Vancouver	1999
E.S.T - Zoo York	2000
F.O.R.E and Friends - Planet Earth - Forrest Kirby and Joe Krolick	2001
E.S.T 2.0 - Zoo York	2001
Unbreakable - Zoo York	2002
E.S.T 3.0 - Zoo York	2002
AKA: Girl Skater - Gallaz / Globe	2003
E.S.T 4.0 - Zoo York	2004
Getting Nowhere Faster - Villa Villa Cola / Element / 411VM	2004
Vicious Cycle - Zoo York - R.B. Umali and Doug Brown	2005
Betty	2020
Skate Dreams	2022

==== Coaching ====
Reyes works with Max Pfannebecker and Triangle Skateboard Alliance teaching young children how to skateboard. Reyes has been a visiting professional at Camp Woodward in Pennsylvania.
