= Peter Hill (entrepreneur) =

Australian skateboarder and entrepreneur

Peter Hill (born 1964 in Melbourne, Australia) is a former champion Australian skateboarder and the co-founder of Globe International, a multinational, youth culture, branded footwear, apparel and skate/surf business with his brother Stephen Hill. Peter Hill has also acted as an executive producer on over 30 media projects, including feature films and television specials and a producer on Eric Bana's Love the Beast.

== Career ==
Peter Hill started skateboarding at age 7 with his brother Stephen in Melbourne in the early 1970s. In their teenage years, they put together one of the early Australian-sponsored skate teams, Sparx, were in the Nike skateboard team in 1979 and competed successfully in Australian skate titles. Along with their younger brother, Matt Hill, they began to import skateboards and associated equipment, eventually forming Hardcore Distribution, a company that later grew into Globe International. In the 1980s, the brothers promoted skateboarding in Australia, running demonstrations and tours featuring local and American skateboarders including Allen Losi, Mark Gonzales, Christian Hosoi, Tony Hawk, Lance Mountain, Lee Ralph, Jeff Phillips and Jason Lee. They also distributed Vision Streetwear and Airwalk shoes.

Peter and Stephen wrote two books on skateboarding, The Skateboard Book: Blast! (1986) and Skate Hard (1988). The design plans from those two books influenced the construction of Australian skateparks and ramps for the following decade. In 1987 the brothers were profiled on a segment on Australian skateboarding on 60 Minutes. In that same year, they co-founded an Australian skateboarding magazine, 540. Peter and his brother were also early snowboarders in Australia and successfully lobbied for snowboarders' access to Australian snow fields.

Peter and Stephen's private company grew throughout the 1990s, and they also licensed major streetwear labels Mossimo, Stüssy, Eckō Unltd., Split, Hardcore Jeans and Paul Frank Industries, along with creating their own proprietary brands, including Globe, Mooks and M-ONE-11. In 2001, Peter oversaw the public float of the company, Globe International, on the Australian Securities Exchange with his brothers, maintaining a large shareholding and subsequently appointed to the board as an executive director. Peter remained actively involved in product development and brand creation, as well as development and positioning for the company as it expanded into North America, Europe and Asia.

Along with his brothers, Peter also founded Whyte House Entertainment, a multimedia company based in Australia and Los Angeles in 1997, where he acted as an executive producer on all titles produced. Peter was a producer on Love the Beast, a feature documentary featuring his friend Eric Bana and released theatrically in Australia and the UK in 2009. Hill executive produced the award-winning surf short film Electric Blue Heaven (2012) Peter also is reported as driving the family group's telco and motorsport company interests. Both he and his brother Stephen held an interest in Boost Mobile with Paul Keating which they collectively sold in 2024.

The Hill brothers featured in the book, Unemployable: 30 Years of Hardcore, Skate and Street released for the 30th anniversary of the Globe and Hardcore companies in 2015. After overseeing six years of development, Hill launched the dot board, an electric skateboard as part of a new division of Globe International, in late 2019.

== Personal life ==
Along with his brother, Stephen, Peter Hill has been listed in BRW Rich 200 list since 2001. Peter maintains an extensive interest in skateboarding and design, as well as being an active participant in surfing, snowboarding, and motorsports.

== Filmography ==
1998 Canvas: The Skateboarding Documentary (television documentary) Executive Producer

2000/1 The Heist (feature film) Executive Producer

2001 Opinion (video documentary) Executive Producer

2001 Tic Tac 2 Heelflip (television documentary) Executive Producer

2001 Down and Out with the Dolls (feature film) Executive Producer

2002 Globe World Cup Skateboarding (TV movie) (producer)

2002 AKA: Girl Skater (documentary) Executive Producer

2003 The Globe World Cup Skateboarding (TV movie) Executive Producer

2004 AKA: Girl Surfer (TV documentary) Executive Producer

2004 The Globe World Cup Skateboarding (TV movie) Executive Producer

2004 Somewhere, Anywhere, Everywhere (surf video) Executive Producer

2004 Almost: Round Three (skate video) Executive Producer

2005 Globe Wildcard Skateboarding (TV movie) Executive Producer

2005 The Globe World Cup Skateboarding (TV movie) Executive Producer

2005 What If? (skate video) Executive Producer

2005 Globe WCT Fiji (TV movie) Executive Producer

2006 The Global Assault!!! (TV movie) Executive Producer

2006 Secret Machine (surf video) Executive Producer

2006 2006 Globe WCT FIJI (video documentary) Executive Producer

2007 United by Fate 2 (TV movie) Executive Producer

2007 The Man Who Souled the World (feature documentary) Executive Producer

2007 Money for Blood (TV documentary) Executive Producer

2007 Inaugural Hobgood Challenge (documentary) Executive Producer

2007 United by Fate 1 (TV movie) Executive Producer

2008 United by Fate 4 (TV movie) Executive Producer

2008 Slaughter at the Opera (TV movie) Executive Producer

2008 United by Fate 3 (TV movie) Executive Producer

2008 New Emissions of Light and Sound (video documentary) Executive Producer

2009 Love the Beast (documentary) Producer

2009 2008 Globe Pro Fiji (TV movie) Executive Producer

2009 United by Fate 5 (TV movie) Executive Producer

2010 United by Fate 6 (TV movie) Executive Producer

2011 Year Zero (surf video) Executive Producer

2012 Electric Blue Heaven (surf video) Executive Producer

2014 Strange Rumblings in Shangri-LA (surf video) Executive Producer

2017 Cult of Freedom (surf video series) Executive Producer

2021 Dark Hollow (surf video) Executive Producer

2021 Garage Dreams (TV Series) Executive Producer

2025 Barefoot: the Lee Ralph Story (Web Series) Self
