= Matt Hill (businessman) =

Australian businessman (born 1970)

- Born: 1970 (age 55–56); Melbourne, Australia
- Education: University of Southern California
- Occupations: CEO of Globe International, film producer
- Relatives: Peter Hill (brother); Stephen Hill (brother)

Matt Patrick Hill (born 1970 in Melbourne, Australia) is the chief executive officer of Globe International and the producer and director of several feature films and documentaries, including Love the Beast (2009) and Down and Out with the Dolls (2001) as producer and Almost: Round Three (2004) and Opinion (2001) as director.

== Career ==
Hill was born and raised in Australia. He began skateboarding, as a young teenager, with his older brothers, Peter and Stephen Hill who founded Hardcore Enterprises, which grew into the skateboard and surfwear company, Globe International. Matt assisted his brothers with their early business ventures, including the distribution of skateboard hardware and clothing and the promotion of skateboard tours and events in Australia. Through the 1980s the brothers continued to build the skateboard, footwear and clothing distribution business.

After high school, Matt Hill studied economics and psychology, graduating with a Bachelor of Arts (Honours) from the University of Melbourne. He then moved to the US in 1995, attending the University of Southern California, graduating with a master's degree in Film Production and producing an Academy Award-winning student film. He subsequently produced and directed numerous documentaries and feature films mostly under the film production company he founded, again with his brothers, in 1998, Whyte House Entertainment. Whyte House Entertainment produced a variety of film, television and online productions working with noted talent such as Eric Bana, Ice-T, and Lemmy Kilmister.

During the same period in the 1990s, the skateboard business expanded into a broader youth culture company and international proprietary brands were created such as Globe, Gallaz and Mooks, producing clothing and footwear. This led to international expansion with operations established in the EU and the USA. Matt Hill helped co-found the North American operation of Globe International, overseeing the development of new product lines and brands for the company.

The three brothers successfully oversaw a public listing of the Globe International Company in 2001 on the Australian Stock Exchange leading to listings on the BRW Rich 200 list. In 2004, Matt Hill was appointed the worldwide CEO of Globe International Limited continuing in through that role to the current day, Hill remains active in the film industry and is based in the Los Angeles Globe office. Hill executive produced the award-winning surf films Electric Blue Heaven (2012) and Strange Rumblings in Shangri-LA (2014) and with his brothers, featured in the book, Unemployable: 30 Years of Hardcore, Skate and Street released for the 30th anniversary of the Globe and Hardcore companies in 2015.

== Filmography ==
- 1998 The Paperboy (short film) Director
- 1998 Canvas: The 'Skateboarding documentary (television documentary) Director
- 2000 The Heist (feature film) Producer
- 2001 Opinion (skate video) Director
- 2001 Tic Tac 2 Heelflip (television documentary) Executive Producer
- 2001 Down and Out with the Dolls (feature film) Producer
- 2002 Globe World Cup Skateboarding (TV movie) Executive Producer
- 2002 AKA: Girl Skater (documentary) Producer
- 2003 Battalion (skate video) Executive Producer
- 2003 The Globe World Cup Skateboarding (TV movie) Executive Producer
- 2004 Almost: Round Three (skate video) Director
- 2004 AKA: Girl Surfer (documentary) Executive Producer
- 2004 The Globe World Cup Skateboarding (TV movie) Executive Producer
- 2004 Somewhere, Anywhere, Everywhere (surf video) Producer
- 2005 The Globe World Cup Skateboarding (television special) Executive Producer
- 2005 What If? (skate video) Producer
- 2005 Globe WCT Fiji (TV movie) Executive Producer
- 2005 Globe Wildcard Skateboarding (television special) Executive Producer
- 2006 The Global Assault!!! (television special) Executive Producer
- 2006 Secret Machine (video) Executive Producer
- 2006 Cheese & Crackers (skate video) Executive Producer
- 2006 2006 Globe WCT FIJI (television special) Executive Producer
- 2007 United by Fate 1 (television special) Executive Producer
- 2007 The Man Who Souled the World (feature documentary) Producer
- 2007 Money for Blood (television special) Executive Producer
- 2007 Inaugural Hobgood Challenge (documentary) Executive Producer
- 2007 United by Fate 2 (television special) Executive Producer
- 2008 United by Fate 4 (television special) Executive Producer
- 2008 Slaughter at the Opera (television special) Executive Producer
- 2008 United by Fate 3 (television special) Executive Producer
- 2008 New Emissions of Light and Sound (video documentary) Executive Producer
- 2009 United by Fate 5 (television special) Executive Producer
- 2009 The Blind Video (video documentary short) Producer
- 2009 Love the Beast (feature documentary) Producer
- 2009 2008 Globe Pro Fiji (television special) Executive Producer
- 2010 United by Fate 6 (television special) Executive Producer
- 2010 Ungu (short film) Executive Producer
- 2011 This Is Not a Test (skate video) Producer
- 2011 Year Zero (surf video) Executive Producer
- 2012 Electric Blue Heaven (surf video) Executive Producer
- 2014 Strange Rumblings in Shangri-LA (surf video) Executive Producer
- 2017 Cult of Freedom (surf video series) Executive Producer
- 2021 Dark Hollow (surf video) Executive Producer
- 2021 Garage Dreams (TV Series) Producer
