= 2009 Bathurst 12 Hour =

Endurance motor racing event

2009 WPS Bathurst 12 Hour

Seasons
- ← 2008 2010 →

Layout of the Mount Panorama Circuit

The 2009 WPS Bathurst 12 Hour was an endurance race for Group 3E Series Production Cars. It was the seventh running of the Bathurst 12 Hour, and the third since the races 2007 revival.

The race was won by defending champions, Rod Salmon's TMR Australia car driven by Salmon, Damien White and new team member, Tony Longhurst in an upgraded Mitsubishi Lancer Evolution.

== Class structure ==
The event was staged at the Mount Panorama Circuit, Bathurst, New South Wales, Australia on 22 February 2009 with cars competing in the following classes:

- Class A – High Performance Rear Wheel Drive
- Class B – High Performance Sports
- Class C – High Performance All Wheel Drive
- Class D – Hot Hatch Performance Cars
- Class E – Production Sedans
- Class F – Production Sports
- Class G – Micro Sedans and Hatches
- Class H – Eco Diesel/Hybrid 3.5 litre and Over
- Class I – Eco Diesel/Hybrid Under 3.5 litre
- Class J – Sports Utility Vehicles & V8 Utes

== Results ==
Pos	Class	Car No.	Team	Drivers	Car	Laps	Grid Pos
Pos	Class	Car No.	Team	Drivers	Engine	Laps	Grid Pos
1	C	1	TMR Australia	(Australia) Rod Salmon (Australia) Tony Longhurst (Australia) Damien White	Mitsubishi Lancer RS Evo X	239	7
1	C	1	TMR Australia	(Australia) Rod Salmon (Australia) Tony Longhurst (Australia) Damien White	2.0 L Mitsubishi 4B11T turbo I4	239	7
2	C	55	West Surfing Products	(Australia) Glynn Crimp (Australia) Tony Ricciardello (Australia) Stuart Kostera	Mitsubishi Lancer RS Evo X	239	4
2	C	55	West Surfing Products	(Australia) Glynn Crimp (Australia) Tony Ricciardello (Australia) Stuart Kostera	2.0 L Mitsubishi 4B11T turbo I4	239	4
3	C	35	Pro-Duct Motorsport	(Australia) Jason Bargwanna (Australia) Steve Knight (Australia) Brad Jones	Mitsubishi Lancer RS Evo X	238	10
3	C	35	Pro-Duct Motorsport	(Australia) Jason Bargwanna (Australia) Steve Knight (Australia) Brad Jones	2.0 L Mitsubishi 4B11T turbo I4	238	10
4	C	43	Easts Holiday Parks	(Australia) David Wall (Australia) Des Wall (Australia) Trevor Symonds	Mitsubishi Lancer RS Evo IX	237	6
4	C	43	Easts Holiday Parks	(Australia) David Wall (Australia) Des Wall (Australia) Trevor Symonds	2.0 L Mitsubishi 4G63T turbo I4	237	6
5	A	11	Rondo Building Services	(Australia) Barry Morcom (Australia) Luke Searle (Australia) Paul Stubber	BMW E90 335i	237	2
5	A	11	Rondo Building Services	(Australia) Barry Morcom (Australia) Luke Searle (Australia) Paul Stubber	3.0 L BMW N54 twin-turbo I6	237	2
6	C	3	Messages on Hold Racing	(Australia) Steven Jones (Australia) Kerry Wade (Australia) Aaron Caratti	Mitsubishi Lancer RS Evo IX	235	15
6	C	3	Messages on Hold Racing	(Australia) Steven Jones (Australia) Kerry Wade (Australia) Aaron Caratti	2.0 L Mitsubishi 4G63T turbo I4	235	15
7	A	23	GSK Group	(Australia) Steve Briffa (Australia) Marcus Zukanovic (Australia) Tim Sipp	HSV E Series Clubsport R8	231	12
7	A	23	GSK Group	(Australia) Steve Briffa (Australia) Marcus Zukanovic (Australia) Tim Sipp	6.2 L GM LS3 V8	231	12
8	A	20	Eastern Creek Karting Raceway	(Australia) Garry Holt (Australia) Paul Morris (Australia) Ric Shaw	BMW E90 335i	228	8
8	A	20	Eastern Creek Karting Raceway	(Australia) Garry Holt (Australia) Paul Morris (Australia) Ric Shaw	3.0 L BMW N54 twin-turbo I6	228	8
9	E	24	Walden Motorsport	(Australia) Garth Walden (Australia) Brian Walden (Australia) Michael Auld	Holden VY Commodore SS	228	26
9	E	24	Walden Motorsport	(Australia) Garth Walden (Australia) Brian Walden (Australia) Michael Auld	5.7 L GM LS1 V8	228	26
10	C	62	Love The Beast	(Australia) Tim Leahey (Australia) Peter Hill (Australia) Eric Bana	Mitsubishi Lancer RS Evo X	228	13
10	C	62	Love The Beast	(Australia) Tim Leahey (Australia) Peter Hill (Australia) Eric Bana	2.0 L Mitsubishi 4B11T turbo I4	228	13
11	A	12	Donut King Racing	(Australia) Tony Alford (Australia) Peter Leemhuis (Australia) Mal Rose	HSV Coupe GTS	227	9
11	A	12	Donut King Racing	(Australia) Tony Alford (Australia) Peter Leemhuis (Australia) Mal Rose	5.7 L GM LS1 V8	227	9
12	F	14	Peter Conroy Motorsport	(Australia) Peter Conroy (Australia) Carl Schembri (Australia) Richard Gartner	Honda Integra Type S	226	38
12	F	14	Peter Conroy Motorsport	(Australia) Peter Conroy (Australia) Carl Schembri (Australia) Richard Gartner	2.0 L Honda K20Z I4	226	38
13	F	21	Peter Conroy Motorsport	(Australia) Terry Conroy (Australia) Lee Burges (Australia) Leanne Tander	Honda Integra Type S	226	35
13	F	21	Peter Conroy Motorsport	(Australia) Terry Conroy (Australia) Lee Burges (Australia) Leanne Tander	2.0 L Honda K20Z I4	226	35
14	A	2	Tulloch Transport	(New Zealand) Ian Tulloch (New Zealand) John Sax (Australia) Cameron McLean	HSV Coupe GTO	226	30
14	A	2	Tulloch Transport	(New Zealand) Ian Tulloch (New Zealand) John Sax (Australia) Cameron McLean	5.7 L GM LS1 V8	226	30
15	A	85	Holden Motorsport	(Australia) Russell Ingall (Australia) Nathan Pretty (Australia) Andrew Jones	HSV E Series Clubsport R8 Tourer	223	17
15	A	85	Holden Motorsport	(Australia) Russell Ingall (Australia) Nathan Pretty (Australia) Andrew Jones	6.2 L GM LS3 V8	223	17
16	A	5	Donut King Racing	(Australia) Barrie Nesbitt (Australia) Paul Freestone (Australia) Rod Jones	HSV VY Series GTS	223	16
16	A	5	Donut King Racing	(Australia) Barrie Nesbitt (Australia) Paul Freestone (Australia) Rod Jones	5.7 L GM LS1 V8	223	16
17	C	34	Pro-Duct Motorsport	(Australia) Glenn Seton (Australia) Neil Crompton	Mitsubishi Lancer RS Evo X	222	5
17	C	34	Pro-Duct Motorsport	(Australia) Glenn Seton (Australia) Neil Crompton	2.0 L Mitsubishi 4B11T turbo I4	222	5
18	D	27	GWS Personnel	(Australia) Allan Shepherd (Australia) Peter O'Donnell (Australia) Christian D'Agostin	BMW E87 130i	220	32
18	D	27	GWS Personnel	(Australia) Allan Shepherd (Australia) Peter O'Donnell (Australia) Christian D'Agostin	3.0 L BMW N52 I6	220	32
19	E	8	Tinkler Motorsport	(Australia) Allan Letcher (Australia) Clint Harvey (Australia) Brett Niall	Ford BF Falcon XR6 Turbo	219	40
19	E	8	Tinkler Motorsport	(Australia) Allan Letcher (Australia) Clint Harvey (Australia) Brett Niall	4.0 L Ford Barra 245T turbo I6	219	40
20	A	69	TJ Motorsport	(Australia) Todd Zani (Australia) John O’Dowd (Australia) Jim Pollicina	HSV VY Series II GTS	216	29
20	A	69	TJ Motorsport	(Australia) Todd Zani (Australia) John O’Dowd (Australia) Jim Pollicina	5.7 L GM LS1 V8	216	29
21	F	50	Racer Industries	(Australia) Gerard McLeod (Australia) Peter McLeod (Australia) Ryan McLeod	Holden AH Astra SRi Turbo	216	37
21	F	50	Racer Industries	(Australia) Gerard McLeod (Australia) Peter McLeod (Australia) Ryan McLeod	2.0 L GM Family II Z20LER turbo I4	216	37
22	E	99	Patinack Farm Racing	(Australia) Jason Tremeer (Australia) Craig Tremeer (Australia) Troy Stone	Ford BF Falcon XR6 Turbo	216	42
22	E	99	Patinack Farm Racing	(Australia) Jason Tremeer (Australia) Craig Tremeer (Australia) Troy Stone	4.0 L Ford Barra 245T turbo I6	216	42
23	A	71	Endless	(Australia) David Mertens (Australia) Leigh Mertens (Australia) Steve Cramp	HSV VY Series GTS	214	19
23	A	71	Endless	(Australia) David Mertens (Australia) Leigh Mertens (Australia) Steve Cramp	5.7 L GM LS1 V8	214	19
24	G	88	Team Bathurst	(Australia) Matthew Windsor (Australia) Steven Shiels (Australia) Paul Newman	Subaru Impreza 2.5	213	45
24	G	88	Team Bathurst	(Australia) Matthew Windsor (Australia) Steven Shiels (Australia) Paul Newman	2.5 L Subaru EJ25 H4	213	45
25	H	76	Thomson Alfa	(Australia) Kean Booker (Australia) Rocco Rinaldo (Australia) David Stone	Alfa Romeo 159 2.4 JTD	208	47
25	H	76	Thomson Alfa	(Australia) Kean Booker (Australia) Rocco Rinaldo (Australia) David Stone	2.4 L Fiat JTDm turbo-diesel I5	208	47
26	D	28	GWS Personnel	(Australia) Lauren Gray (New Zealand) John de Veth (Australia) Rob Thomson	BMW E87 130i	204	39
26	D	28	GWS Personnel	(Australia) Lauren Gray (New Zealand) John de Veth (Australia) Rob Thomson	3.0 L BMW N52 I6	204	39
27	G	66	Jim Hunter Motorsport	(New Zealand) Heather Spurle (New Zealand) Christina Orr (Australia) Molly Taylor	Subaru Impreza 2.0R	203	48
27	G	66	Jim Hunter Motorsport	(New Zealand) Heather Spurle (New Zealand) Christina Orr (Australia) Molly Taylor	2.0 L Subaru EJ20 H4	203	48
28	D	36	Grand Prix Mazda	(Australia) Jake Camilleri (Australia) Scott Nicholas	Mazda 3 MPS	201	25
28	D	36	Grand Prix Mazda	(Australia) Jake Camilleri (Australia) Scott Nicholas	2.3 L Mazda MZR L DISI turbo I4	201	25
29	E	94	APORSCHAPART	(Australia) Richard Howe (Australia) Dennis O’Keefe (Australia) Roger Lago	Ford BF Falcon XR6 Turbo	195	46
29	E	94	APORSCHAPART	(Australia) Richard Howe (Australia) Dennis O’Keefe (Australia) Roger Lago	4.0 L Ford Barra 245T turbo I6	195	46
30	A	17	Supercar Club Australia	(Australia) Steven Johnson (Australia) Nathan Tinkler (Australia) Nathan Callaghan	FPV FG GT-P	187	33
30	A	17	Supercar Club Australia	(Australia) Steven Johnson (Australia) Nathan Tinkler (Australia) Nathan Callaghan	5.4 L Ford Boss 315 V8	187	33
31	B	10	Lotus Cars Australia	(Australia) Mark O’Connor (Australia) Richard Buttrose (Australia) Simon Hogg	Lotus Exige	186	28
31	B	10	Lotus Cars Australia	(Australia) Mark O’Connor (Australia) Richard Buttrose (Australia) Simon Hogg	1.8 L Toyota 2ZZ-GE supercharged I4	186	28
32	I	77	Thomson Alfa	(Australia) David Filipetto (Australia) Nathan Gotch (Australia) Wayne Vinckx	Alfa Romeo 147 JTD	156	44
32	I	77	Thomson Alfa	(Australia) David Filipetto (Australia) Nathan Gotch (Australia) Wayne Vinckx	1.9 L Fiat JTD turbo-diesel I4	156	44
DNF	F	13	Osborne Motorsport	(Australia) Colin Osborne (Australia) Neal Bates (Australia) John Roecken	Toyota Celica ZR	172	36
DNF	F	13	Osborne Motorsport	(Australia) Colin Osborne (Australia) Neal Bates (Australia) John Roecken	1.8 L Toyota 2ZZ-GE I4	172	36
DNF	B	15	Rockstar Energy Drink	(Australia) Josh Hunt (Australia) Jonathon Webb (Australia) Paul Stokell	Nissan 350Z	149	23
DNF	B	15	Rockstar Energy Drink	(Australia) Josh Hunt (Australia) Jonathon Webb (Australia) Paul Stokell	3.5 L Nissan VQ35HR V6	149	23
DNF	E	18	Team Queensland Racing	(Australia) James Moffat (Australia) Glen Kenny (Australia) Corey Baldock	Ford FG Falcon XR8	146	34
DNF	E	18	Team Queensland Racing	(Australia) James Moffat (Australia) Glen Kenny (Australia) Corey Baldock	5.4 L Ford Boss 290 V8	146	34
DNF	C	91	Mek-Tek Motorsport	(Australia) Anton Mechtler (Australia) Jason Walsh (Australia) Mark Brame	Mitsubishi Lancer RS Evo VIII	122	18
DNF	C	91	Mek-Tek Motorsport	(Australia) Anton Mechtler (Australia) Jason Walsh (Australia) Mark Brame	2.0 L Mitsubishi 4G63T turbo I4	122	18
DNF	C	29	VIP Pet Foods	(United Kingdom) Tony Quinn (Australia) Kent Quinn (Australia) Grant Denyer	Mitsubishi Lancer RS Evo IX	98	3
DNF	C	29	VIP Pet Foods	(United Kingdom) Tony Quinn (Australia) Kent Quinn (Australia) Grant Denyer	2.0 L Mitsubishi 4G63T turbo I4	98	3
DNF	A	32	GSK Group	(Australia) Gerard Keogh (Australia) Bob Brewer (Australia) Geoff Emery	HSV E Series Clubsport R8	96	24
DNF	A	32	GSK Group	(Australia) Gerard Keogh (Australia) Bob Brewer (Australia) Geoff Emery	6.2 L GM LS3 V8	96	24
DNF	I	67	Nemo Racing	(Australia) Taz Douglas (Australia) Brett Holdsworth (Australia) Glen Holdsworth (Australia) Lee Holdsworth	Holden AH Astra CDTi	94	43
DNF	I	67	Nemo Racing	(Australia) Taz Douglas (Australia) Brett Holdsworth (Australia) Glen Holdsworth (Australia) Lee Holdsworth	1.9 L Fiat JTD turbo-diesel I4	94	43
DNF	C	44	Jim Hunter Motorsport	(Australia) Jim Hunter (Australia) John Bowe (Australia) Gavin Bullas	Subaru Impreza WRX	85	22
DNF	C	44	Jim Hunter Motorsport	(Australia) Jim Hunter (Australia) John Bowe (Australia) Gavin Bullas	2.5 L Subaru EJ255 turbo H4	85	22
DNF	C	33	Pro-Duct Motorsport	(Australia) Mark King (Australia) Bob Pearson (Australia) Bruce Stewart	Mitsubishi Lancer RS Evo X	81	14
DNF	C	33	Pro-Duct Motorsport	(Australia) Mark King (Australia) Bob Pearson (Australia) Bruce Stewart	2.0 L Mitsubishi 4B11T turbo I4	81	14
DNF	C	22	Wilson Brothers Racing	(Australia) Chris Delfsma (Australia) David Wood (Australia) Gary Tierney	Subaru Impreza WRX	71	27
DNF	C	22	Wilson Brothers Racing	(Australia) Chris Delfsma (Australia) David Wood (Australia) Gary Tierney	2.0 L Subaru EJ207 turbo H4	71	27
DNF	C	25	Wilson Brothers Racing	(New Zealand) Craig Baird (Australia) Lee Castle (Australia) Rodney Forbes	Subaru Impreza WRX	65	20
DNF	C	25	Wilson Brothers Racing	(New Zealand) Craig Baird (Australia) Lee Castle (Australia) Rodney Forbes	2.0 L Subaru EJ207 turbo H4	65	20
DNF	F	31	Osborne Motorsport	(Australia) Stuart Jones (Australia) Trevor Keene (Australia) Simon Evans	Toyota Celica ZR	62	41
DNF	F	31	Osborne Motorsport	(Australia) Stuart Jones (Australia) Trevor Keene (Australia) Simon Evans	1.8 L Toyota 2ZZ-GE I4	62	41
DNF	C	96	Superbarn Supermarkets	(Australia) James Koundouris (Australia) Theo Koundouris (Australia) Steve Owen	Mitsubishi Lancer RS Evo IX	61	1
DNF	C	96	Superbarn Supermarkets	(Australia) James Koundouris (Australia) Theo Koundouris (Australia) Steve Owen	2.0 L Mitsubishi 4G63T turbo I4	61	1
DNF	J	47	Hi-Tech Motorsport	(Australia) Grant Johnson (Australia) Jeff Watts (Australia) Greg Willis	Holden VE Ute SS	41	21
DNF	J	47	Hi-Tech Motorsport	(Australia) Grant Johnson (Australia) Jeff Watts (Australia) Greg Willis	6.0 L GM LS2 V8	41	21
DNF	C	26	Wilson Brothers Racing	(New Zealand) Paul Kelly (Australia) Dean Grant (Australia) Max Twigg	Subaru Impreza WRX	34	31
DNF	C	26	Wilson Brothers Racing	(New Zealand) Paul Kelly (Australia) Dean Grant (Australia) Max Twigg	2.0 L Subaru EJ207 turbo H4	34	31
DNS	C	9	Cera Sport	(United Kingdom) Charlie Hollings (Australia) Nathan Caratti (New Zealand) Colin Corkery	Mitsubishi Lancer RS Evo IX		11
DNS	C	9	Cera Sport	(United Kingdom) Charlie Hollings (Australia) Nathan Caratti (New Zealand) Colin Corkery	2.0 L Mitsubishi 4G63T turbo I4		11

== Statistics ==
- Pole Position – #96 Steve Owen – 2:28.8838
- Fastest Lap – #55 Tony Ricciardello – 2:29.9865
- Average Speed – 124km/h
