= Whyte House Entertainment =

Film company

- Industry: Entertainment
- Number of locations: Los Angeles; Melbourne
- Key people: Matt Hill, Peter Hill, Stephen Hill, Brett Hardy
- Website: whytehouseentertainment.com

Whyte House Entertainment (formerly known as Whyte House Productions) is an international film, television and multimedia production company with over 25 years of experience and is owned by brothers, Matt, Peter and Stephen Hill who also created the skateboarding and surfing shoe and streetwear apparel company Globe International. The company has offices in Melbourne, Australia and Los Angeles, US.

== History ==
Whyte House was founded in the mid 1990s by Matt, Peter & Stephen Hill, along with long-time collaborator, Brett Hardy. In 1999, in addition to being involved in the distribution of Canvas: The Skateboarding Documentary including several key staff on its production, one of the first projects undertaken by Whyte House, was the documentary, Tic Tac 2 Heelflip: Australia’s Skateboarding History, which featured in the Melbourne International Film Festival and was broadcast nationally and internationally in 2001. The first feature film project undertaken in 2000 by Whyte House Productions was the crime drama titled The Heist. The film was shot on location in Los Angeles and starred Luke Perry, Ice-T, Richmond Arquette, David Faustino, Robert Wisdom and Amy Locane. Post-Production was later completed in Melbourne, Australia. This was followed by the 2001 film Down and Out with the Dolls, an all girl rock band saga shot and set in Portland, Oregon and directed by Kurt Voss. Down and Out with the Dolls featured musicians such as Lemmy Kilmister, Zoe Poledouris, Coyote Shivers, Kinnie Starr, Inger Lorre and Janis Tanaka in the cast. The film also played at the Karlovy Vary International Film Festival. Whyte House continued its association with Globe and its associated brands, creating web sites, streaming major action sports events including the Globe World Cup staged at Melbourne’s Rod Laver Arena and the Globe WCT Fiji surf event from the island of Tavarua in the Pacific Ocean. The company also produced a number of television commercials and skate and surf videos for home entertainment and online platforms and claims to be one of the first to operate in that area. Whyte House produced television specials and films for various skate and surf brands including Globe, Almost, Blind, Gallaz, Enjoi, Darkstar, Dwindle Distribution and SMP, including the skateboarding Opinion, AKA: Girl Skater and the surf-based Somewhere Anywhere Everywhere videos.

In 2007 Whyte House chronicled rise of the modern skateboard industry in the 1990s with The Man Who Souled the World, a feature documentary focussed on the founder of World Industries, Steve Rocco, which premiered at the Melbourne International Film Festival and won a best editing award at the X-Dance film festival. The 2009 feature documentary Love the Beast went on to become the second highest grossing Australian documentary in history. The film was the directorial debut of Actor Eric Bana and also featured Jay Leno, Dr Phil McGraw and Jeremy Clarkson along with motor racing icon, Jim Richards. During the production of Love the Beast, Whyte House and its production partner, Pick Up Truck Pictures, initiated a carbon neutral approach to the production of Love the Beast, considered a world first for an Australian film. The film’s international premiere was staged at the Tribeca Film Festival in New York city following an invitation from the organization headed up by Actor Robert De Niro and Producer Jane Rosenthal. The company worked again with Globe in 2014 on the release of the surf film Strange Rumblings in Shangri-LA.

== Filmography ==
- 1998 Canvas: The Skateboarding Documentary (television documentary) Distributor
- 2000/1 The Heist (feature film) Production company in association with Arama Entertainment
- 2001 Opinion (video documentary) Production company
- 2001 Tic Tac 2 Heelflip (television documentary) Production company
- 2001 Down and Out with the Dolls (feature film) Production company
- 2002 Globe World Cup Skateboarding (TV movie) Production company
- 2002 AKA: Girl Skater (documentary) Production company
- 2003 The Globe World Cup Skateboarding (TV movie) Production company
- 2004 AKA: Girl Surfer (TV documentary) Production company
- 2004 The Globe World Cup Skateboarding (TV movie) Production company
- 2004 Somewhere, Anywhere, Everywhere (surf video) Production company
- 2004 Almost: Round Three (skate video) Production company
- 2005 Globe Wildcard Skateboarding (TV movie) Production company
- 2005 The Globe World Cup Skateboarding (TV movie) Production company
- 2005 What If? (skate video) Production company
- 2005 Globe WCT Fiji (TV movie) Production company
- 2006 The Global Assault!!! (TV movie) Production company
- 2006 2006 Globe WCT Fiji (video documentary) Production company
- 2006 Cheese & Crackers (skate video) Production company
- 2007 The Man Who Souled the World (feature documentary) Production company
- 2008 Shanghai Showdown (TV special) Production company
- 2009 Love the Beast (feature documentary) Production company in association with Pick Up Truck Pictures
- 2014 Strange Rumblings in Shangra-LA (surf video) Distribution company
