= Getting Nowhere Faster =

- Produced by: Villa Villa Cola
- Starring: Vanessa Torres; Amy Caron; Lyn-Z Adams Hawkins; Alex White
- Distributed by: Element
- Release date: 2004
- Running time: 45 minutes
- Country: United States
- Language: English

Getting Nowhere Faster is a 2004 American skate video featuring female skateboarders. The video features skateboarding footage of the world's most prominent female skateboarders, as well as a fiction film called The Skatepark Hauntings of Debbie Escalante. The skateboarding footage is interwoven with scenes from the video. The DVD features an option to watch only the skateboarding footage, or the storyline sections of the feature. The video is considered to be a major influence on the progression of women in skateboarding.

== Synopsis ==
Debbie Escalante and her partner, the Cowboy, haunt a skate park, until a group of female skaters leave their dance class to combat Debbie.

== Featured skaters ==
- Amy Caron
- Vanessa Torres
- Lyn-Z Adams Hawkins
- Alex White
- Kenna Gallagher
- Faye Jaime
- Lauren Mollica
- Van Nguyen
- Elizabeth Nitu
- Nugget
- Stefanie Thomas
- Patiane Frietas
- Lauren Perkins

== Cameos ==
- Elissa Steamer, Cara-Beth Burnside, Jen O'Brien, Monica Shaw, Lisa Whitaker, Jessie Van Roechoudt, Leo Baker

== DVD bonus features ==
- Bonus skate footage of several skaters
- Tour footage
- Skate footage from the public
- Slideshow

== Sponsors ==
- Element Skateboards
- Etnies
- SG Magazine
- PETA2
