= Vanessa Torres =

American skateboarder

Personal information
- Born: July 17, 1986 (age 40) Anaheim, California, U.S.
- Height: 5 ft 2 in (1.57 m)
- Weight: 120 lb (54 kg)

Sport
- Sport: Skateboarding
Medal record
Women's street skateboarding
Representing the United States
World Championships
Silver medal – second place	2015 Chicago	Street
Summer X Games
Gold medal – first place	2003 Los Angeles	Park
Silver medal – second place	2004 Los Angeles	Street
Bronze medal – third place	2015 Austin	Street
Bronze medal – third place	2016 Oslo	Street
SLS Super Crown
Silver medal – second place	2015 Chicago	Street

Vanessa Torres (born July 17, 1986) is a professional skateboarder. She is sponsored by Meow Skateboards and is the first woman to win X Games gold.

In 2003, the X Games first featured female skateboarding competitions; Torres placed first, winning gold, in the street event (then called Park). Torres won silver in the X Games Street Competition in 2004 and placed in the top ten in 2005–2011 and 2014. In 2015 at the X Games in Austin and 2016 at the X Games in Oslo, Torres won bronze. She again placed in the top ten in 2016 and 2017.

She is featured in several women's skateboarding videos such as AKA: Girl Skater (2003), Getting Nowhere Faster (2004), and Quit Your Day Job (2014). She also appears in the video game Tony Hawk's Proving Ground, making her the third female as a playable skater to appear in the Tony Hawk's video game series after Elissa Steamer and Lyn-Z Adams Hawkins.

Torres is of Mexican descent from Modesto, California. She dropped out of high school to pursue skateboarding. She splits her personal time living in San Diego and San Francisco, California.

She was inducted into the Skateboarding Hall of Fame in 2026.

Favorite Skateparks
Name of Skatepark	City	State
Belvedere	East Los Angeles	California
Sheldon	Sun Valley	California
Santa Clarita	Santa Clarita	California
Sunnyvale	Sunnyvale	California
Ceres	Ceres	California
SoMa	San Francisco	California
Potrero del Sol/La Raza	San Francisco	California
