= Anti Social Social Club =

Streetwear brand

- Product type: Clothing Streetwear
- Current owner: Marquee Brands
- Country: Los Angeles, United States
- Introduced: 2015; 11 years ago
- Markets: Worldwide
- Tagline: Self Doubt
- Website: antisocialsocialclub.com

Anti Social Social Club (sometimes stylized as ASSC and AntiSocialSocialClub) is a Los Angeles–based streetwear brand founded by Andrew Buenaflor, who goes by the pseudonym Neek Lurk. As of May 2022, the brand is wholly owned by Marquee Brands.

Anti Social has collaborated with A Bathing Ape, Rimowa, Dover Street Market, Playboy, Hello Kitty, Hot Wheels, DHL, Panda Express, National Football League, Formula 1, FaZe Clan, Goodsmile Racing, and Gran Turismo.

== History ==
Anti Social Social Club was founded in 2015 through Twitter. The founder, Neek Lurk, had previously worked as a social marketing manager for Stüssy. It releases limited collections each year. The inspiration for creating this brand came from the founder's mental health struggle at age 27. Lurk used his brand as an emotional outlet for his depression. The first product was a basic hat with the logo on the side. Shortly after its founding, ASSC became a popular trend. Some notable celebrities have worn this brand such as Kanye West, BTS, and Kim Kardashian.

The brand released exclusively at ComplexCon Sk8-Hi Vans and Nike Air Force 1 Low (24 pairs were sold). A Toyota Prius decorated with ASSC graphics sold for $20,000. ASSC had also announced the release of a branded riot shield.

In 2018, after reports of numerous failed deliveries of ASSC products purchased online, the brand launched a collection (SS18) that echoed its customers' disgruntlement regarding shipping issues.

In December 2024, ASSC launched its first standalone retail space in the UK with a pop-up at Selfridges, London, which remained open until early January 2025. This event coincided with the debut of a dedicated UK website, offering British fans access to global releases and exclusive local collaborations.

== See also ==
- Billionaire Boys Club (clothing retailer)
- Virgil Abloh
- OVO
- The Hundreds
- Freshjive
- Stüssy
- Highsnobiety
