= Globe International =

Australian surf and skateboard footwear and apparel manufacturer

- Type: Public
- Traded as: ASX: GLB
- Industry: Skateboard; surf; snow; workwear
- Founded: 1985
- Headquarters: Melbourne, Australia
- Products: Shoes; apparel; skateboards; accessories
- Website: globecorporate.com

Globe International Limited is an Australian footwear, clothing, and skateboard hardware company. It was founded in 1985 by three Australian brothers. Globe International's core business is divided between proprietary brands, licensed brands, and distributed brands. The company's international offices are located in Melbourne, Los Angeles, Costa Mesa and San Diego (United States); Hossegor (France) and Shenzhen (China). It is listed on the Australian Securities Exchange.

== History ==
The foundation of Globe International was established in the 1980s, with the founding of Hardcore Enterprises, an Australian-based company specialising in products that appealed to the skateboard and street fashion markets. In 1985, former Australian skateboarding champions Peter and Stephen Hill, along with brother and current Globe International CEO Matt Hill, began Hardcore which would later develop into one of the world's largest skateboard distribution companies. The Hills cited that they were unsatisfied with the lack of quality skate products they required, and thus they went into business to import US skate products to Australia.

The Hills continued to promote skateboarding, writing two books on the subject and producing skate videos. Through constant promotions, tours, contests, video and magazine advertising, Hardcore became a driving force behind the skateboarding explosion during the mid-1980s in Australia and New Zealand. The first diversification company Die Hard Pty Ltd was founded in 1987 as a clothing and accessories division of the business. Die Hard's first licensed label was Vision Street Wear.

Die Hard went on to produce premier labels under license for the Australian and New Zealand markets such as Stüssy, Mossimo, Freshjive, Paul Frank, Eckō Unltd., Counter Culture, Split, Girl Star, Undergirl and World Industries. The Hills also co-founded the streetwear brand Mooks which also operated under the Die Hard umbrella. Die Hard became known as Globe International's Streetwear Division and was one of the largest suppliers of branded youth clothing in Australia and New Zealand when it was sold to Pacific Brands in 2006.

In 1995, Globe International established its US operation in Los Angeles, where the Globe brand is now a part of the American boardsports sub-culture and a key supplier to major retailers of boardsports apparel, footwear and skateboard hardgoods.

In 2001, Globe International listed on the Australian Securities Exchange and achieved the Initial Public Offer goals. In 2002, Globe International acquired Kubic Marketing, a holding company that owned World Industries and Dwindle Distribution, which at the time, was the parent company for skateboard brands such as Enjoi, Blind, Darkstar and Tensor. Acquiring Dwindle, a company founded by professional skateboarders Rodney Mullen and Steve Rocco, made Globe International one of the world's biggest skateboard companies. In 2003, Globe International established its European headquarters, located along the south-west surf coast of France in Hossegor. As of 2017, the European office sells directly in the major boardsports markets of the UK, France, Germany, Spain, Portugal, Belgium, Netherlands, and Austria, among others. All other significant markets in Europe are serviced by third-party distributors.

Having established a stable of proprietary brands and an international distribution network in 2006, Globe International made a strategic decision to divest itself of its licensed Australian Streetwear Division to Pacific Brands and focus on further international expansion of the company's proprietary brands. In 2009, Globe International added to its brand portfolio by acquiring Europe's number one skateboard brand Cliché and expanding it through international markets. In 2010, Globe International re-entered the Australian streetwear market and established a new division entitled "4Front Distribution", a company that is currently responsible for the Australian distribution of brands such as Stüssy, Obey and Misfit. Globe also moved its Melbourne headquarters to the inner-city suburb of Port Melbourne during the same year, occupying a building that was formerly owned by chocolate company Cadbury's.

Globe operates its own factory to manufacture the skateboards and trucks. The DSM (Douglas Street Manufacturing) Premium Woodshop is located in Shenzhen, China, with skateboard icon Rodney Mullen closely involved in its production practices from its inception. DSM imports maple logs from Canada's Great Lakes region for the production of its decks. A 2013 TransWorld SKATEboarding article likened DSM's approach to the sourcing and treatment of wood; "as the sandwich shop that prepares all of their meat from the whole animal versus others who order their cuts from a wholesaler. DSM has the in-house butcher." DSM was first publicly announced in 2003 and caused a widespread surprised reaction in the skateboard industry, as production had previously been solely based in North America and concern was raised about job losses. Globe CEO Matt Hill, stated at the time: "When you get down to the labor issues, if we sell a lot more boards, then we'll create jobs here (in the U.S.A.), it'll open a lot more doors."

In 2015, the company launched a book 'Unemployable: 30 Years of Hardcore, Skate and Street' to celebrate its 30th anniversary, and held launches in Melbourne and Los Angeles. In 2017, the company acquired the American brand, Salty Crew and in 2019, sold the Dwindle part of the business. Towards the end of 2019, the company launched an electric skateboard product, the dot board. In 2022, Globe acquired the swimwear brand It's Now Cool and launched MilkBar bikes. As of 2026, the company operates a small number of branded retail stores in a couple of locations: Port Melbourne, Victoria and Hossegor.

== Proprietary brands ==
- Globe
- FXD Workwear
- Salty Crew
- Impala Skate
- X/DMG workwear

== Third-party brands ==
- X-Large
- S/Double
- Stance
- Szade
- Ritual Vision
- Pro-Tec
- Enjoi
- Girl
- Chocolate
- Thrasher
- Flip
- Royal
- Zero

== Team ==
=== Skateboarding ===
- Rodney Mullen
- Austyn Gillette
- Mark Appleyard
- Sammy Montano
- Christian Maalouf
- Val Bauer

=== Surfing ===
- Shaun Manners
- Dion Agius
- Taj Burrow
- CJ Hobgood
- Damien Hobgood
- Nate Tyler
- Noa Deane
- Creed McTaggart
- Brendon Gibbens
- Eric Geiselman

=== Snowboarding ===
- David Carrier Porcheron
- Jan Petter Solberg
- Romain De Marchi

== Filmography ==
The company has produced numerous films and short films, incorporating both skateboarding and surfing subcultures. Between 2007 and 2010, the brand released a series of six short films entitled United By Fate, directed by Joe "Joe G" Guglielmino, and featuring all of the skate team members during that period. The inaugural episode of United By Fate featured Canadian skateboarder Paul Machnau, while the final instalment was a compilation of footage from different team members, such as Jake Duncombe, Louis Lopez and Chris Haslam.

Joe G and Globe began filming their latest surf film Strange Rumblings in Shangri La at the commencement of 2013, and were awarded the 2014 Surfer Poll Movie of the Year in December 2014. The film featured Globe team members Dion Agius, Nate Tyler, Creed McTaggart, Taj Burrow, CJ and Damien Hobgood, Yadin Nicol, Brendon Gibbons and Noa Deane in locations such as Iceland, Brazil, France, Mozambique and Indonesia.

=== Skateboarding videography ===
- Canvas
- Opinion
- United By Fate 1–6

=== Surfing videography ===
- Somewhere, Anywhere, Everywhere
- The Secret Machine
- New Emissions of Light and Sound
- Ungu
- Year Zero
- Electric Blue Heaven
- Icecream
- Strange Rumblings in Shangri La
- Cult of Freedom web series
- Dark Hollow

== Major events ==
=== Skateboarding ===
- Globe World Cup Skateboarding – Melbourne, Australia 2002
- Globe World Cup Skateboarding – Melbourne, Australia 2003
- Globe World Cup Skateboarding – Melbourne, Australia 2004
- Globe World Cup Skateboarding – Melbourne, Australia 2005
- The Global Assault!!! – Melbourne, Australia 2006
- Double Stack Cash Attack – Gold Coast, Australia 2007
- Slaughter at the Opera – Sydney, Australia 2008

=== Surfing ===
- Globe Pro Fiji WCT Event – Tavarua Island, Fiji 2005
- Globe Pro Fiji WCT Event – Tavarua Island, Fiji 2006
- Globe Pro Fiji WCT Event – Tavarua Island, Fiji 2008

== Special projects ==
Led by its Special Project Division, Globe has worked with other well-known brands and artists, including:

- The Clash
- Jason Ellis
- Devo
- Christies of London
- G-Shock
- Gears of War
- Splatterhouse
- Gojira
- Sekure D
- Wayne 'Rabbit' Bartholemew
- Martin Potter
- Pete Townend
- Halo X
- Neff
- Beavis and Butt-Head
- Desillusion Magazine
- Monster Children
- Sesame Street
- Yes. Snowboards
