= Alex White (skateboarder) =

American skateboarder

Alexandra White
- Education: Loyola Marymount University
- Occupation: Skateboarder
- Known for: Skateboarding

Alexandra White is a skateboarder from Los Angeles, California.

== Skateboarding ==
Alex White is a female skater. She began skateboarding at the age of 13 in Los Angeles. She is a commentator for Street League Skateboarding and works for Krux Trucks.

== Skateboard videos ==
White is featured on the skate DVD Getting Nowhere Faster. This DVD features skateboarding footage of Alex White, as well as footage of her being detained for skateboarding on private property.

== Personal life ==
White has two children and attended Loyola Marymount University. She is lesbian and rallies for female empowerment and equality both in skating and other areas.
