= Paul Frank =

American cartoonist (born 1967)

- Born: Paul Frank Sunich; August 29, 1967 (age 58); Huntington Beach, California, U.S.
- Occupations: Advertising artist and fashion designer
- Known for: Creator of Paul Frank Industries

Paul Frank Sunich (born August 29, 1967, in Huntington Beach, California) is an American advertising artist and fashion designer. He is the creator of all the characters from Paul Frank Industries, including Julius the Monkey.

== Early life and education ==
During the 1990s, Sunich was an art student at Orange Coast College in Costa Mesa, California.

== Career ==
He bought a sewing machine in order to complete small projects. One day, he used some spare orange vinyl to create a wallet and after seeing his work, his friends expressed interest in other accessories, so he began to sew items such as guitar straps and backpacks. A few years later, Sunich formed Paul Frank Industries (his first and middle name) along with his partners Ryan Heuser and John Oswald, in order to keep up with the demand for his products. He worked at another job during the day, but sewed and sold his products during his spare time. The company expanded, with collaborations with many bands, artists, and companies.

Sunich left Paul Frank Industries in November 2005, in a dispute with his business partners. His first clothing design project after leaving the company was a brand licensing arrangement with the Boone's Farm beverage company. Sunich owned and headed his own design studio Park La Fun.

In February 2016 he returned to Paul Frank Industries, now owned by Saban Brands.
