= Rimowa =

German luggage company

- Type: GmbH
- Industry: Travel
- Founded: 1898; 128 years ago
- Founder: Paul Morszeck
- Headquarters: Richard-Byrd-Str. 13, 50829, Cologne, Germany
- Area served: Worldwide
- Key people: Beatrice Monguidi, CEO
- Products: High-end luggage
- Owner: LVMH
- Number of employees: 3,000
- Website: rimowa.com

Rimowa GmbH (German pronunciation: [ʁɪˈmoːva]), often stylized as RIMOWA, is a German luxury luggage manufacturer founded in 1898 in Cologne, Germany.

Rimowa suitcases are known for their parallel aluminium grooves, which have become characteristic of the brand. The company's headquarters are in Cologne.

In October 2016, LVMH agreed to purchase an 80% stake in Rimowa, making Rimowa the group's first German company. From 2017 to 2021, the company was managed by Alexandre Arnault. Hugues Bonnet-Masimbert became CEO in 2021. Beatrice Monguidi became CEO in June 2026.

== History ==
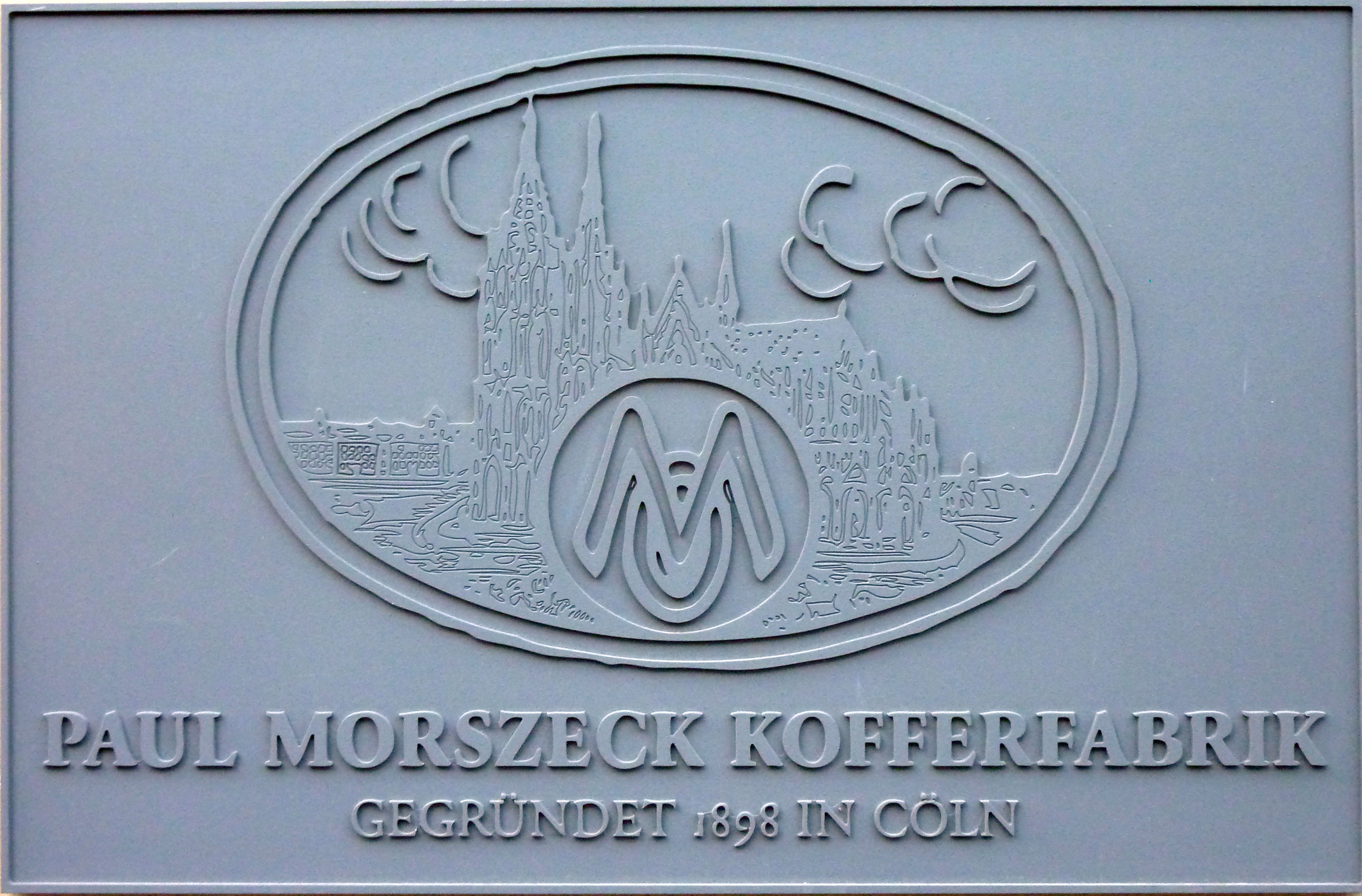
Paul Morszeck Kofferfabrik, 1898

Rimowa traces its origins to 1898, when Paul Morszeck established a luggage-making business in Cologne. The company initially operated under the name Görtz & Morszeck with Heinrich Görtz before Morszeck became its sole director.

During the 1920s, Paul Morszeck's son Richard became involved in the company. The company increasingly experimented with aluminium, a material whose use was growing in aircraft construction. In 1931, Richard Morszeck registered the Rimowa trademark at the Reich Patent Office in Berlin. The name "Rimowa" was derived from Richard Morszeck Warenzeichen, with Warenzeichen meaning "trademark".

During the 1930s, a fire at the company's factory destroyed much of its stock and materials while leaving its aluminium inventory intact. Aluminium subsequently became an important material in the company's luggage production.

In 1950, Rimowa introduced parallel grooves to the aluminium shells of its suitcases. The design was influenced by the appearance of early all-metal aircraft and became one of the company's identifying visual features.

During the 1970s, Dieter Morszeck, representing the third generation of the family, joined the company. In 1978, he developed a waterproof case intended for professional photography and filmmaking equipment. Rimowa expanded into the Japanese market in 1979.

In 2000, Rimowa began producing suitcases made from polycarbonate, providing a lighter alternative to its aluminium luggage.

In October 2016, Rimowa joined the LVMH Group after LVMH acquired an 80% stake in the company for €640 million. Rimowa became LVMH's first German company, and Alexandre Arnault subsequently became CEO.

In 2018, Rimowa introduced a new visual identity created with the London design studio Commission.

Hugues Bonnet-Masimbert became chief executive in January 2021, coinciding with the introduction of the Never Still range of backpacks and travel bags.

In 2022, Rimowa introduced a lifetime guarantee for new suitcases covering functional damage. Beatrice Monguidi succeeded Bonnet-Masimbert as chief executive in June 2026.

Rimowa manufactures products at facilities in Germany, the Czech Republic and Canada.

=== Rimowa identity evolution: 1898–present ===
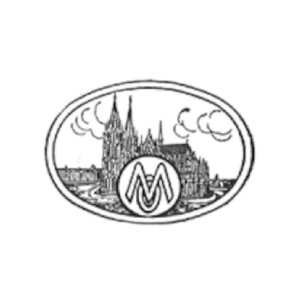
Identity 1898–1937

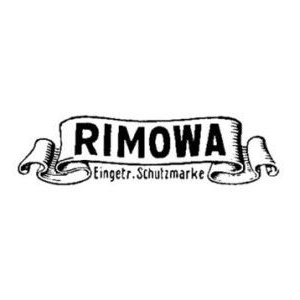
Identity 1937–1950

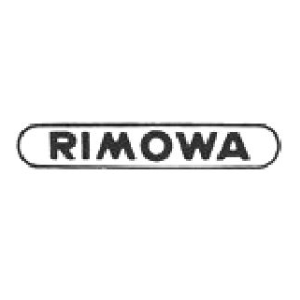
Identity 1950–1981

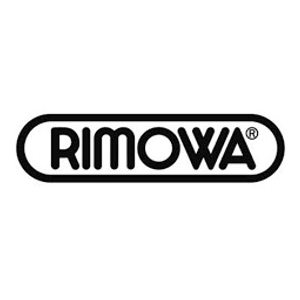
Identity 1981–2018

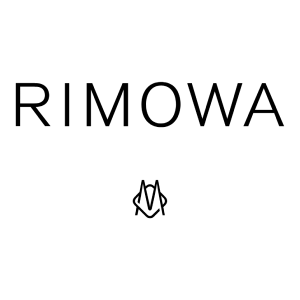
Identity 2018–present

== Aeroplane ==
Rimowa was involved in a project to construct an airworthy replica of the Junkers F 13, an early all-metal passenger aircraft. The project was initiated by then-Rimowa president and CEO Dieter Morszeck and involved several aviation organizations and engineering companies.

The replica, named Annelise 2, made its official maiden flight from Dübendorf Air Base in Switzerland on 15 September 2016. The project involved seven years of research, planning and regulatory work, while construction of the aircraft took approximately 12,000 working hours over 24 months. Original plans and a laser scan of a surviving aircraft at the Musée de l'Air et de l'Espace near Paris were used during the design process.

== Product lines ==
Rimowa produces luggage using materials including aluminium, polycarbonate and leather. Historically, the company marketed products under names including Topas, Limbo, Salsa, Pilot, Silver Classic, Classic Flight, Columbus and Attaché.

Its current principal luggage collections include:

- Original – aluminium luggage featuring the company's characteristic grooved shell.
- Classic – aluminium luggage with leather handles and detailing.
- Essential – polycarbonate luggage.
- Essential Lite – a lightweight polycarbonate range.
- Essential Sleeve – polycarbonate luggage incorporating an exterior compartment.
- Hybrid – luggage combining polycarbonate shells with aluminium components.
- Distinct – leather luggage.

Rimowa also markets bags and travel accessories under collections including Never Still and Groove.

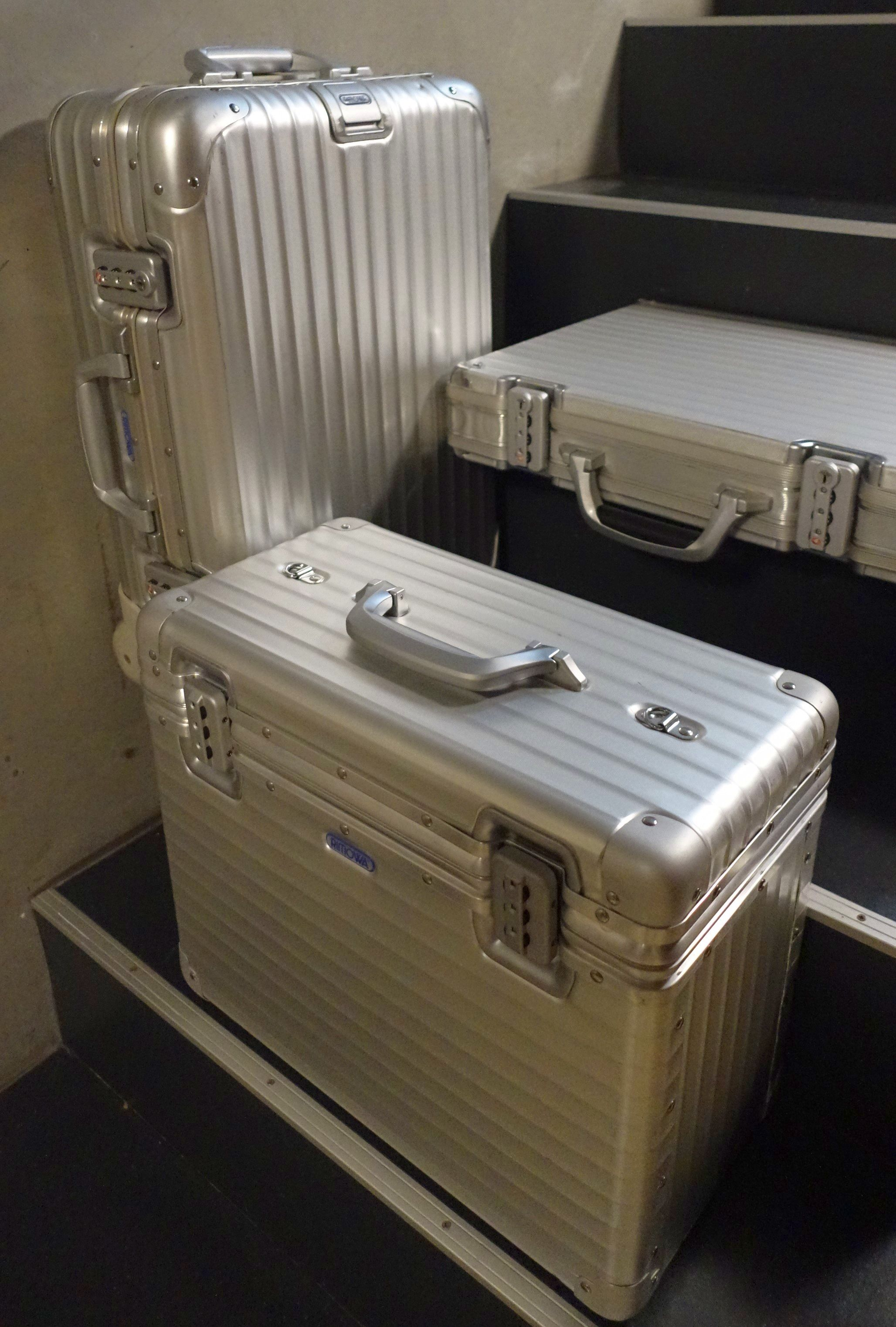
Rimowa luggage

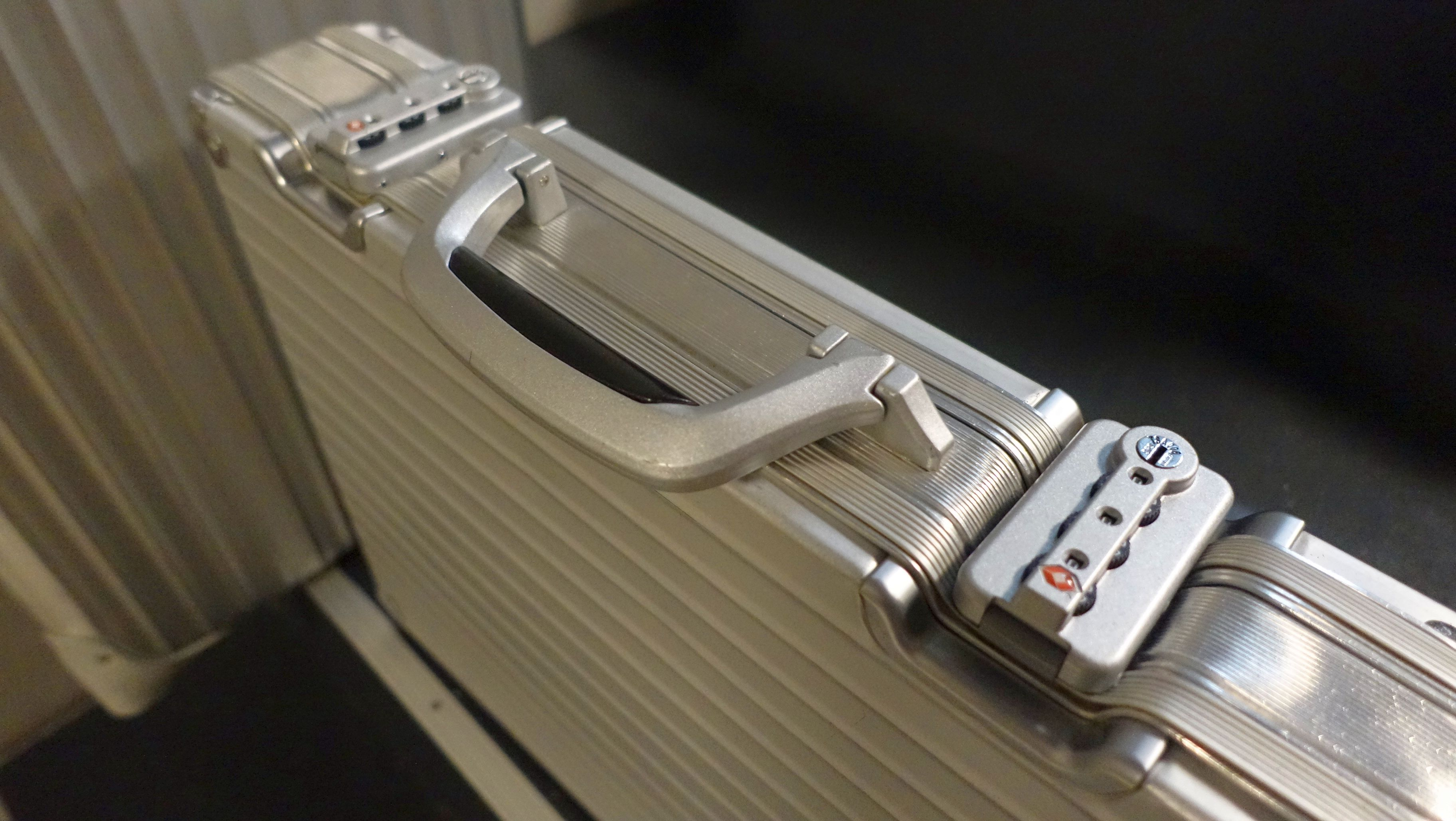
Attaché briefcase

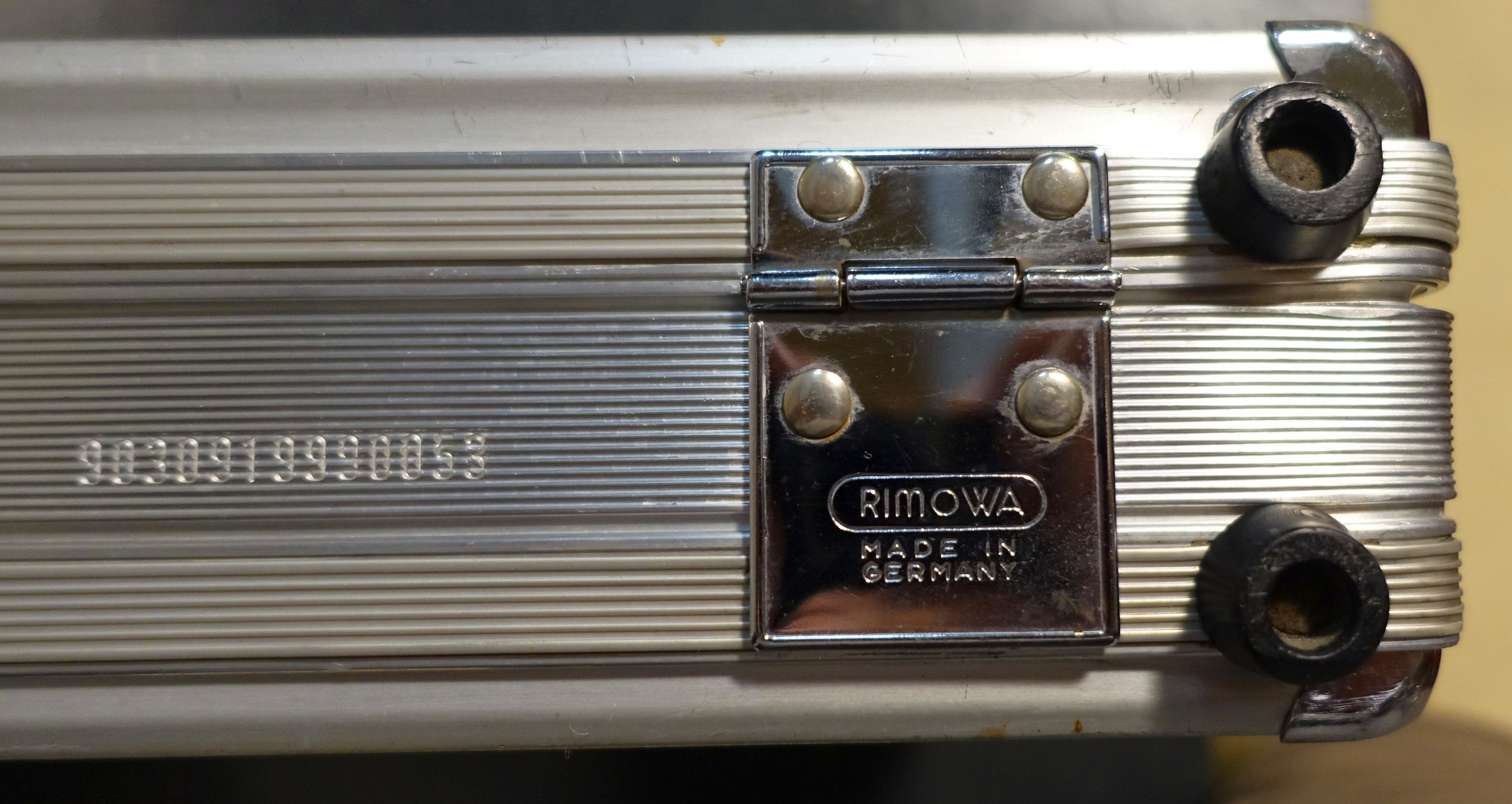
Production number and model-year details

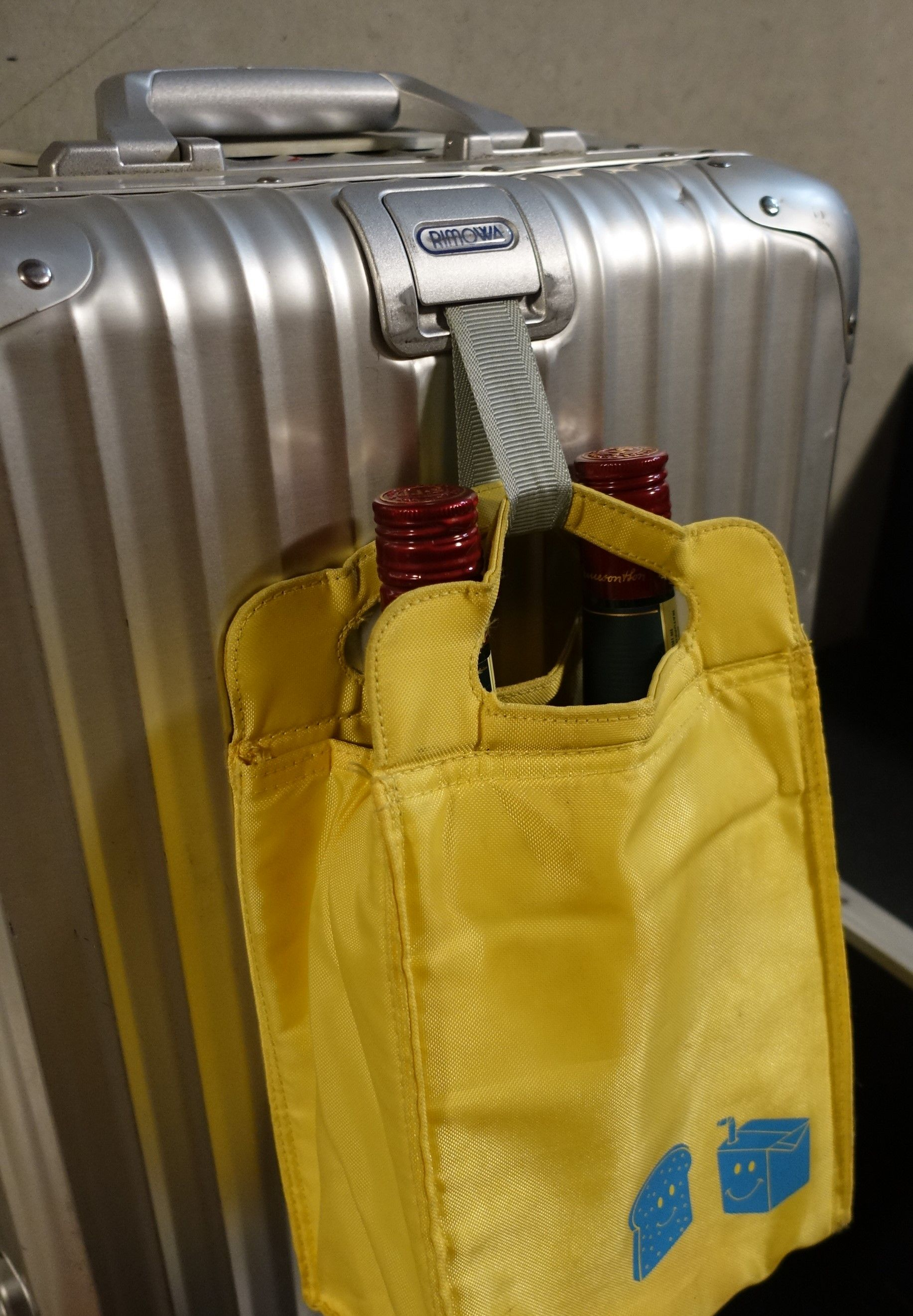
Case details

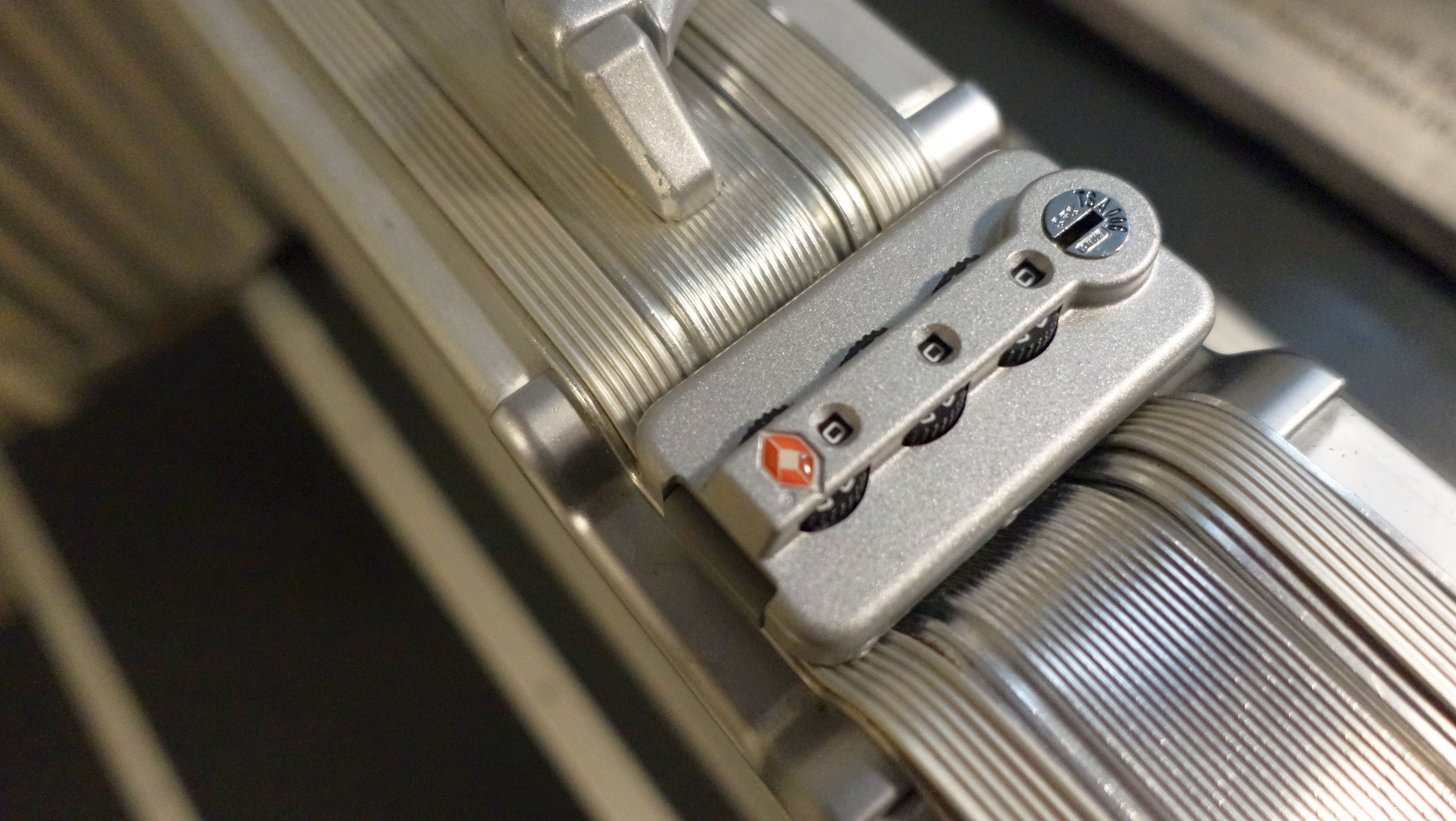
Repairable components

== Collaborations ==
Rimowa has established several partnerships with German brands, including Lufthansa since 1998 and Porsche since 1999. As part of the Porsche partnership, Rimowa has produced special editions of its suitcases with specific colours or designs.

Since 2017, Rimowa has increasingly pursued collaborations and long-term partnerships. Collaborators have included:

- Fendi
- Monocle
- Moncler
- Supreme
- Off-White
- Daniel Arsham
- Anti Social Social Club
- Alex Israel
- Aesop
- Adidas
- Tiffany & Co.

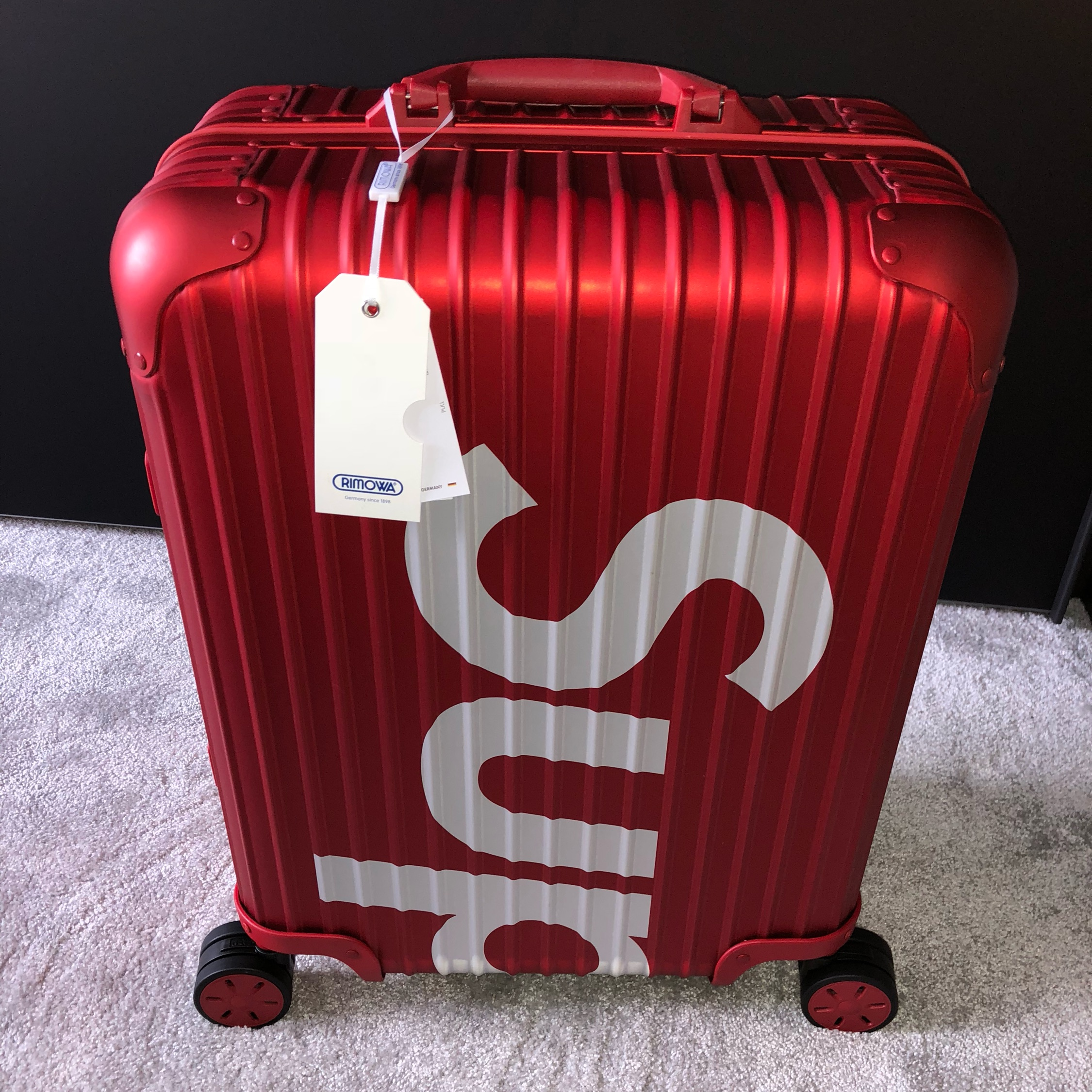
Rimowa x Supreme Cabin Red 45L, 2018

=== Supreme ===
In 2018, New York skateboarding brand Supreme and Rimowa collaborated on custom versions of the Original suitcase featuring the Supreme logo. The limited-edition suitcases were produced in red and black.

In 2019, a second collection featured a spider-web design anodized into the aluminium surface of Rimowa Original cases. Available in Cabin Plus and Check-In L sizes, the collaboration included a co-branded leather luggage tag, custom lining and a matching shoe bag.

=== Off-White ===
In 2018, Rimowa collaborated with streetwear label Off-White and its founder Virgil Abloh. The capsule collection included a transparent polycarbonate suitcase based on the Essential collection, called "See Through", and a black Original case bearing Off-White branding.

=== Dior ===
In 2019, Rimowa partnered with luxury fashion house Dior and menswear artistic director Kim Jones to develop a capsule collection of luggage. The collection included versions of the Rimowa Original Cabin and Original Trunk featuring Dior's Oblique design, as well as a Hand Case based on Rimowa's 1990s "Piccolo" case and a smaller cross-body design called the Rimowa Personal. The collection debuted during Dior's Men's Summer 2020 fashion show in Paris.

=== Daniel Arsham ===
In 2019, contemporary artist Daniel Arsham and Rimowa collaborated on a limited-edition art project inspired by the company's archives. Arsham created a numbered "eroded suitcase" series based on a vintage Rimowa Attaché briefcase.

In May 2019, number 008/500 of the edition sold for US$14,000 at Sotheby's in New York. Arsham and Rimowa collaborated again in 2022 on limited-edition Pilot cases containing sculptural "eroded" turntables.

== Ambassadors ==
For its "Never Still" global brand campaign, Rimowa has featured a number of public figures as brand ambassadors.

People appearing in Rimowa campaigns have included:

- LeBron James
- Rihanna
- Patti Smith
- Kim Jones
- Yuja Wang
- Roger Federer
- Virgil Abloh
- Adwoa Aboah
- Yoon Ahn
- Nobu Matsuhisa
- Jay Chou
- Rosé
- Joe Alwyn

== Awards ==
Year	Country	Award	Category	Ranking	Product
2010	USA	Travel + Leisure	Best Luggage	1st place	Salsa Deluxe
2014	Germany	Red Dot Award	Online (Homepage)	1st place	Rimowa
2015	Germany	Welt (Munich Strategy Group)	Top 100 Small- and medium-sized companies	1st place	Rimowa
2015	Global	Future Travel Experience	Best Baggage Initiative	1st place	Rimowa & Lufthansa for Rimowa Electronic Tag
2016	Germany	Innovations-Champions 2016	Munich Strategy Group	1st place	Rimowa
2016	Germany	Digital Pioneer 2016	Digital Pioneer	1st place	Rimowa Electronic Tag
2017	Germany	Art Directors Club	Digitale Medien Craft > Innovative Technologie	1st place	Rimowa Electronic Tag
2017	USA	Surface Travel Awards	Luggage high-end	1st place	Rimowa Electronic Tag
2017	Germany	Art Directors Club	Digitale Medien > Usage innovant des réseaux sociaux	2nd place	Rimowa Electronic Tag
2017	France	Cannes Lions	Mobile A Technology A07 Connected Devices	2nd place	Rimowa Electronic Tag
2017	USA	CLIO Awards	Digital / Mobile Other	2nd place	Rimowa Electronic Tag
2017	Germany	Deutscher Digital Award	9.2 Transformation Digitale - Innovation	2nd place	Rimowa Electronic Tag
2017	UK	London International Awards	The New Product Innovation	Shortlist	Rimowa Electronic Tag
2019	USA	Fast Company Awards	50 Most Innovative Companies	Shortlist	Rimowa Product Range
2019	USA	Fast Company Awards	The 9 most timeless designs of the past 25 years	Shortlist	Rimowa Original Cabin silver suitcase
2019	USA	Surface Magazine	The Best New Luggage of The Year	1st place	Rimowa x Alex Israel suitcase
