= Amy Caron =

American skateboarder

- Born: November 2, 1984 (age 40); Castro Valley, California, U.S.
- Occupation: Professional Skateboarder
- Height: 5 ft 5 in (165 cm)

Amy Caron (born November 2, 1984) is an American professional skateboarder living in Long Beach, California.

== Skateboarding ==
Caron was at the forefront of a small group of professional female skaters. She began skateboarding at the age of 12, and is currently sponsored by Meow Skateboards. Caron has stood on the X Games podium in the bronze-medal position three times—2003 in Park and 2007 and 2008 in Street. She is co-founder of the skateboarding magazine, Bigfoot Skateboard Magazine, along with co-founder and fellow skateboarder Meghan McGuire.

== Skateboard videos ==
Caron is heavily featured on the skate DVD AKA: Girl Skater. It features footage of her 1st place win at the Gallaz Skate Jam in Australia. Caron's prize was a new Ford car, which she crashed in the stadium.

She is also featured in the renowned female skate DVD Getting Nowhere Faster.
