= Lauren Perkins =

American skateboarder (born 1988)

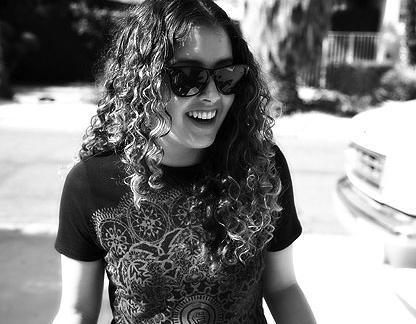
- Perkins in 2008
- Born: Lauren Grace Perkins; December 27, 1988 (age 37); United States
- Other name: Perkulater or Perkie
- Education: Orange Coast College
- Occupation: Professional Skateboarder
- Years active: 1998–present
- Known for: Skateboarding
- Height: 5 ft 5 in (1.65 m)
- Website: www.laurengraceperkins.com

Lauren Grace Perkins (born December 27, 1988) is an American professional skateboarder and model from Los Angeles, California.

== Skateboarding ==
Perkins is one of a very small group of professional female skaters. She began skateboarding in 1998 when a skate park was built close to her house. She thought it looked fun, so she asked for a skateboard for her birthday.

Away from skateboarding, Perkins enjoys snowboarding, surfing, and motocross.

== Skateboard videos and films ==
Perkins is featured on the skate DVD Getting Nowhere Faster.

Perkins was a stunt double for Jennifer Morrison in the film Grind, performing the characters skateboarding scenes. This was arranged by her team manager at Volcom.

In the film MVP 2: Most Vertical Primate, Perkins played Sammy Rogers, a young skater competing in a skateboard competition.

== Career skateboarding highlights ==
- 1998 – First girl to compete street in CASL
- 1998 – 2nd place in All Girls Street Jam
- 1999 – 2nd place overall 11-12 age group against all boys
- 2000 – 1st place at the Gravity Games amateur contest (beating out 45 boys)
- 2001 – 3rd place Triple Crown
- 2002 – 1st place All Girls Street Jam
- 2002 – 2nd place Australia
- 2003 – 1st place West 49th
- 2003 – 2nd place overall ladies street rankings
- 2004 – 2nd place Gravity Games
- 2005 – 2nd place Australia
- 2006 – 2nd place XGames
- 2007 – 2nd place Mystic Cup
- 2008 – 1st place S3 Super Girl Jam

== Television and movies ==
- Fruit by the Foot Commercial
- “MVP II”
- “Grind”
- Daily Habit (first girl street skateboarder to be on the show)
- CNBC “On the Money”
