= Freshjive =

American clothing brand

Freshjive is an American streetwear brand founded in 1989 by artist and entrepreneur Rick Klotz. The brand drew its roots from surf culture and skate culture and is famous for its artwork including controversial topics such as Palestine, animal studies, police brutality, domestic violence and Pentagon's black operations. In 2011 Complex Magazine named Freshjive as the #4 Greatest Streetwear Brand after Stüssy, Supreme and A Bathing Ape.

In 2009, Freshjive removed the name of the brand from all products.

== See also ==
- Highsnobiety
- Punk fashion
- Street fashion
- Dover Street Market
- Anti Social Social Club
- Billionaire Boys Club
- Virgil Abloh
- OVO
