= Elissa Steamer =

American professional skateboarder (born 1975)

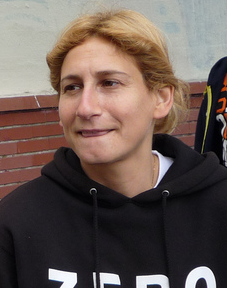
- Steamer in 2009

Personal information
- Born: July 31, 1975 (age 51) Fort Myers, Florida, U.S.
- Occupation: Professional skateboarder
- Years active: 1989–present
- Height: 5 ft 4 in (1.63 m)
- Weight: 121 lb (55 kg)

Sport
- Country: United States
- Sport: Skateboarding
- Turned pro: 1998
Medal record
Summer X Games
Representing United States
Gold medal – first place	2004 Los Angeles	Street
Gold medal – first place	2005 Los Angeles	Street
Gold medal – first place	2006 Los Angeles	Street
Gold medal – first place	2008 Los Angeles	Street
Silver medal – second place	2007 Los Angeles	Street
Bronze medal – third place	2009 Los Angeles	Street

Elissa Steamer (born July 31, 1975) is an American professional skateboarder.

== Early life ==
Steamer was born in Fort Myers, Florida, and began skateboarding in 1989. Steamer frequented a small city-owned skate-park on Grand Avenue.

== Professional skateboarding ==
=== 1995–1998: Toy Machine, Welcome to Hell ===
Although she received a concurrent offer from Real Skateboards to ride the company's decks, Steamer first began receiving skateboard decks from Lance Mountain in 1995, who was running a company named "The Firm" at the time.

Steamer's first official skateboard deck sponsor was Toy Machine, founded and owned by professional skateboarder, Ed Templeton. Professional skateboarder, Chad Muska, then a leading member of the Toy Machine team, facilitated Steamer's sponsorship; at the time of Steamer's acceptance, Toy Machine consisted of Templeton, Muska, Mike Maldonado, Jamie Thomas, and Brian Anderson.

Steamer subsequently filmed for her Welcome to Hell video part, a 1996 project primarily driven by Thomas, who temporarily resided with Steamer in Fort Myers to undertake the camera work for Steamer's section in the video. Steamer remained with the company following Thomas and Muska's departure and contributed a video part for Toy Machine's next film project, Jump Off A Building.

=== 1998–2003: Baker, Baker 2G, Bootleg ===
Following the departure of numerous co-riders from Toy Machine, Steamer informed Templeton by telephone that she was also leaving and joined the Bootleg brand which was founded as a sub-division of the Baker skateboard company. Bootleg was distributed by the NHS, Inc. company (Independent, Creature, Santa Cruz) and Steamer's involvement was a progression of her personal connection to skateboarders such as Andrew Reynolds and Erik Ellington. Bootleg was founded by Jay Strickland, who also cofounded the Baker brand with Reynolds, and was a short-lived, month-long venture that ended following a video release, Bootleg 3000.

Prior to Bootleg 3000, Steamer's video parts were included in the Baker Bootleg and 2G videos. Steamer stated in 2014 that her highest paycheck from skateboard deck royalties was received during her time with Bootleg.

=== 2004–2011: Zero, Fourth X Games gold ===
Steamer was provided with a three-month paycheck following the demise of Bootleg in 2004, and Frank Gerwer, a professional skateboarder who lived with Steamer, attempted to negotiate a sponsorship deal with the Anti-Hero brand that he also rode for, but was ultimately unsuccessful. Thomas, who had by this time founded his own skateboard company, Zero, asked Steamer to ride for the brand, and she joined the Zero team in June 2006.

Following Steamer's transition to Zero, she filmed a shared video part with Thomas, who had not amassed enough footage for a full-length part. Steamer never filmed a full-length video part while she was a member of the Zero team (Thomas has stated in an online interview that Steamer never released a full-length part due to insufficient involvement with the company's filmers and a tendency to lose momentum due to outside distractions).

At the 2008 X Games event in Los Angeles, US, Steamer won her fourth X Games gold medal in the Women's Street event. The women's category was introduced in 2004 and 2007 was the only year that Steamer did not win gold, as she won silver after Marisa Dal Santo. Following her victory, Steamer explained to the New York Times that she felt like vomiting for the entire duration of the contest and attributed the issue to "old age". At the time, Mimi Knoop, a professional vert skater and vice president of the Action Sports Alliance, a nonprofit association of professional women's skateboarders, said that "Elissa has paved the way for those girls in street and set the bar ability-wise for all those girls that are coming up."

Steamer eventually parted ways with Zero in July 2011 and explained in an ESPN interview:

Me and Jamie [Thomas] have been friends for a long time. It was a difficult decision to make. It's hard enough to make career decisions let alone those heavy ones. It's like breaking up with someone, you know? Zero was five years of my life. Of course I'm thankful for that. And Jamie hooked me up.

=== 2012–present: Gnarhunters, Return to Baker ===
In late September 2013, Steamer launched a collaboration with the FTC skateboard shop/brand entitled "Gnarhunters." Steamer explains in the promotional video that, as of the FTC collaboration, Gnarhunters is a "project," but will eventually become a brand. Steamer received artistic support from professional skateboarders Brian Anderson and Frank Gerwer, as well as professional artists. As of July 2014, the company is registered in the American city of San Francisco. In June 2018, Bakerboys Distribution's Shake Junt released an Elissa Steamer guest board along with a 'Ride or Die' web short featuring recent skatepark footage. Later in the same month, Baker Skateboards introduced Steamer to the pro team, releasing her first signature board for the brand. As of 2021, Gnarhunters is distributed by Baker Boys Distribution.

== Awards and honors ==
In 2003, Steamer was voted "Female Skater of the Year" by Check it Out Girls magazine.

In 2015, Steamer was inducted into the Skateboarding Hall of Fame.

== Video games ==
Steamer appeared as a playable character in the first five installments of the Tony Hawk's Pro Skater series and in the 2020 remake Tony Hawk's Pro Skater 1 + 2. In 2014, Steamer explained that her biggest paychecks during her skateboarding career were due to video game royalties.

Andrew Reynolds said in September 2014 that all of the skateboarders who appeared in the first game of the series were well-paid:

So for the first game, everybody got paid. Elissa Steamer, myself, whoever else was in it, we were laughing—we got like one check for royalties that was like $190,000 or something. We were like, 'What! This is amazing!' ... I really love that Elissa Steamer got $190,000 out of it too. [Laughs] That's my favorite part.

== Personal life ==
In a June 2014 radio interview, Steamer said that she had purchased property in Fort Myers, Florida, during her skateboarding career and that the profit from these properties, which are overseen by a manager, support her life in California.

In July 2020, Steamer told Skateboarding Magazine's radio show that she identifies as queer. In January 2021, she told Thrasher that she lives with her fiancée Rachel Garcia and their dogs Randy and Lily in San Francisco, California.

== Contest history ==
=== 1998 ===
- 1st place, Slam City Jam, Women's Street, Canada

=== 1999 ===
- 1st place, Slam City Jam, Women's Street, Canada

=== 2003 ===
- 1st place, World Cup of Skateboarding, Women's Street, Melbourne, Australia

=== 2004 ===
- 1st place, Gallaz Skate Jam, Melbourne, Australia
- 1st place, Triple Crown, Women's Street, Cleveland, Ohio, US
- Gold, X Games, Women's Street, Los Angeles, California, US
- 1st place, Gravity Games, Women's Street, Cleveland, Ohio, US
- 1st place, Triple Crown Finals, Women's Street, Huntington Beach, California, US
- 1st place, Slam City Jam, Women's Street, Vancouver, British Columbia, Canada

=== 2005 ===
- 1st place, World Cup of Skateboarding, Women's Street, Melbourne, Australia
- 1st place, World Championships of Skateboarding, Münster, Germany
- Gold, X Games, Women's Street, Los Angeles, California, US
- 1st place, Malaysia X Games, Women's Street, Malaysia

=== 2006 ===
- Gold, X Games, Women's Street, Los Angeles, California, US

=== 2007 ===
- Silver, X Games, Women's Street, Los Angeles, California, US

=== 2008 ===
- Gold, X Games, Women's Street, Los Angeles, California, United States (US)

== Videography ==
- Toy Machine: Welcome to Hell (1996)
- Toy Machine: Jump Off a Building (1998)
- Baker: Bootleg (1998)
- Baker: 2G (2000)
- Bootleg: Bootleg 3000 (2003)
- Nike: Gizmo (2019)
- Baker: Baker4 (2019)
- Baker: Baker Has A Deathwish Part 2 (2024)
