= Mooks clothing company =

Australian streetwear brand

Mooks
- Industry: Fashion
- Founded: Melbourne, Australia (1991)
- Founders: Peter Hill and Stephen Hill
- Headquarters: Melbourne, Australia
- Products: Clothing and Accessories
- Parent: Pacific Brands

Mooks is an Australian streetwear clothing brand, founded by graphic designer Richard Allan and brothers Peter and Stephen Hill in 1991. Design influences include manga, Japanese baseball, American college sport, and skater culture. Its first retail store opened in 1992 on Chapel Street, Melbourne. In 2007, Mooks was acquired by the Pacific Brands conglomerate from Globe International.

According to the company, "Mook" is old New York slang for a hipster, a hustler, a wiseguy or even a fool.
