= Action Sports Alliance =

Sport Association

Action Sports Alliance (The Alliance) is a non-profit association of professional female skateboarders and other action sports athletes. The Alliance was founded in 2005 by Cara-Beth Burnside, Mimi Knoop, and Drew Mearns. Burnside was the first president.

In 2006, the Alliance helped negotiate significant prize money increases for female vert and street skateboarders at the X Games and helped add a women's surfing event to the line-up.

The business of the Alliance is run by a board of directors composed of leading professional athletes who are elected and appointed by the pro membership according to the organization bylaws.

The Alliance later merged with the Womens Skateboarding Alliance (WSA) to gain global management and consultation on services around women’s skateboarding trends in events, film, TV, and commercial spaces. The WSA was founded in 2015 by Mimi Knoop.
