= Lauren Mollica =

American skateboarder (born 1980)

- Born: July 7, 1980 (age 45)
- Occupation: Professional skateboarder
- Known for: Skateboarding

Lauren Mollica (born July 7, 1980) is an American professional skateboarder from New Brunswick, New Jersey.

== Skateboarding ==
Mollica is one of a very small group of professional female skaters. Started by snowboarding, and only skateboarded off and on until she graduated high school.

Her sponsors include Gallaz and Rookie.

== Skateboard videos ==
Mollica is featured on the skate DVD Getting Nowhere Faster. She is also featured giving skateboarding tips as a bonus feature on AKA: Girl Skater but does not appear on the feature itself.

== Feature films ==
Mollica made her feature film debut in Itty Bitty Titty Committee as the trans man character Aggie.

== Other activities ==
Mollica has achieved recognition for fly fishing, having appeared in a 2019 LA Times article, "Fly fishing for ‘sewer salmon’ in the L.A. River," and as a guest on the podcast "Beer, Fly Fishing & Food (2020).
