= Marisa Dal Santo =

American skateboarder (born 1987)

Marisa Dal Santo (born August 3, 1987) is a regular-footed American former professional skateboarder and e-commerce clothing retailer from La Grange, Illinois.

== Skateboarding career ==
Dal Santo is recognized as a trailblazer in women's street skateboarding.

Skate video Parts & Appearances	Year
Zero – Strange World	2009
Emerica – Stay Gold	2010
Zero/DGK – Fresh ’til Death	2011
Destruction Squirrel 6	2012
Chicago Neighborhood Watch	2015

=== Zero ===
Marisa Dal Santo turned down an offer to go pro for Zero. In 2009, Dal Santo had a full part in Zero skateboard’s Strange World. In 2010, Dal Santo quit Zero. In 2017, Dal Santo was given a guest pro model on Zero in honor of the 20th anniversary of the company.
