= Cara-Beth Burnside =

American skateboarder and snowboarder

Personal information
- Nickname: CB
- Born: July 23, 1971 (age 54) Orange, California, United States
- Home town: Oceanside, California
- Education: University of California, Davis
- Occupation(s): Professional skateboarder and snowboarder
Medal record
Winter X Games
Representing United States
Silver medal – second place	1997 Big Bear Lake, California	SBD Slopestyle
Gold medal – first place	1998 Crested Butte, Colorado	SBD Half Pipe
Bronze medal – third place	1999 Crested Butte, Colorado	SBD Half Pipe
Summer X Games
Representing United States
Gold medal – first place	2003 Los Angeles	SKB Vert
Silver medal – second place	2004 Los Angeles	SKB Vert
Gold medal – first place	2005 Los Angeles	SKB Vert
Gold medal – first place	2006 Los Angeles	SKB Vert
Bronze medal – third place	2007 Los Angeles	SKB Vert

Cara-Beth Burnside, nicknamed "CB" (born July 23, 1971), is a professional skateboarder and snowboarder and has been ranked amongst the top female athletes in these sports in the world. She was the first president of the Action Sports Alliance.

== Skateboarding career ==
Burnside started skating in men's amateur skating competitions in the 1980s due to the lack of women's skate contests. During this time, Burnside started to learn to snowboard due to the lack of professional opportunities for female skaters.

As a skateboarder, Burnside has won more than 16 titles in competitions such as the X Games, All Girl Skate Jam, Vans Triple Crown, Slam City Jam and Soul Bowl, and in 2004 she was named Female Vert Skater of the Year by World Cup Skating. She has received a total of 5 Summer X Games medals for skateboarding.

In 1989, Burnside became the first woman to appear on the cover of Thrasher and in 1999, she became the first woman to have a signature skate shoe.

Burnside was named TransWorld Skateboarding's female vert skater of the year in 2004.

In 2015, Burnside was inducted into the Skateboarding Hall of Fame.

== Snowboarding career ==
Burnside was on the first United States Olympic snowboarding team at the 1998 Winter Olympics in Nagano, Japan, where she placed 4th. She has also won titles at the snowboarding Grand Prix, the X Games and the Vans Triple Crown.

She has received a total of 3 Winter X Games medals for snowboarding.

== Personal life ==
Burnside is an advocate for opportunities in women's sports and founded the Action Sports Alliance in 2005 to create more professional opportunities for women in sports. The Action Sports Alliance also helped secure equal pay for women at the X Games.

Burnside is a vegetarian.

== Filmography ==
She is featured in the beginning and end titles for the documentary film Not Bad for a Girl.

== Video game appearances ==
Burnside is a playable character in the video games Grind Session and Tony Hawk: Ride.
