= Jeff Phillips (skateboarder) =

American skateboarder (1963–1993)

Jeffrey S. Phillips
Personal information
- Born: June 11, 1963 Dallas, Texas, U.S.
- Died: December 25, 1993 (aged 30)
- Resting place: Rest Haven Memorial Park, Rockwall, Texas, U.S.
- Occupation: Skateboarder
- Height: 6 ft 2 in (188 cm)

Sport
- Sport: Skateboarding
- Turned pro: 1983

Jeff Phillips (June 11, 1963 – December 25, 1993) was an American professional skateboarder.

Phillips grew up in Dallas, Texas and started skateboarding at 10 years old. In 1973, his grandmother Annice gave him a Shark skateboard with steel wheels. Jeff and his father, Charles, crafted skateboards at home out of scraps of birch and plywood. As a teenager he frequented Wizard Skateboard Park in Garland and then a few years later Skate Time at Bachman Lake, in Dallas featuring the infamous Blue Ramp/Clown Ramp.

Phillips won his first contest as a sponsored amateur in July 1982 at the Kona/Variflex Summer Nationals. In March 1986, Phillips placed third at the opening NSA Pro-Am event in Houston. He was also in the movie about the Expo 1986 in Vancouver called "Radical Moves". Later in December, he claimed a victory at the NSA Pro-Am Final in Anaheim, defeating competition favorite Tony Hawk. The next year, Phillips featured on the cover of Thrasher Magazine's March 1987 issue. During his career, Phillips featured in magazine adverts for such brands as Sims Skateboards, G&S, and Tracker Trucks.

Phillips popularized the skateboarding trick that he called the Phillips 66. The trick was adapted from the Fakie 360 invert, which Phillips credited to Shawn Peddie.

In the late 1980s, as Phillips' career as a competitive sponsored skater was winding down, he bought an indoor skateboard park and named it the Jeff Phillips Skateboard Park. Phillips ran the park with fellow Zorlac skater Billy Smith. However, by 1993 the park had developed financial difficulties, which led Phillips to consider selling it. The park stayed closed for several months after Phillips' death until Charles Kieser, an in-line skater who had known Jeff, rented and renovated the park, recovered some of the old ramps and reopened in April 1994 as Rapid Revolutions.

== Death ==
On Christmas Day, 1993, Phillips' family members became concerned when he did not appear at his parents' house as previously planned. Later in the afternoon, Phillips' friend and neighbor, Judy Walgren, discovered Phillips slumped over on his bed with a self-inflicted gunshot wound to the head and a .357 Magnum revolver. An autopsy revealed alcohol and Valium in Phillips' body.

Phillips was buried at Restland Memorial Park with locks of his friends' hair and the last skateboard he rode.
