= Lee Ralph =

New Zealand skateboarder

- Born: Lee Ralph
- Known for: skateboarding; sculpture; murals
- Notable work: Te Mau Mahara (1999)

Lee Ralph is an artist and former New Zealand professional skateboarder from Auckland. Active from the late 1970s and the 1980s, Ralph's sudden disappearance from the skateboarding scene in the early 1990s sparked several subsequent investigations and articles and in 2024 he became the subject of an upcoming television series 'Sk8 or Die'.

== Early life and skateboarding career ==
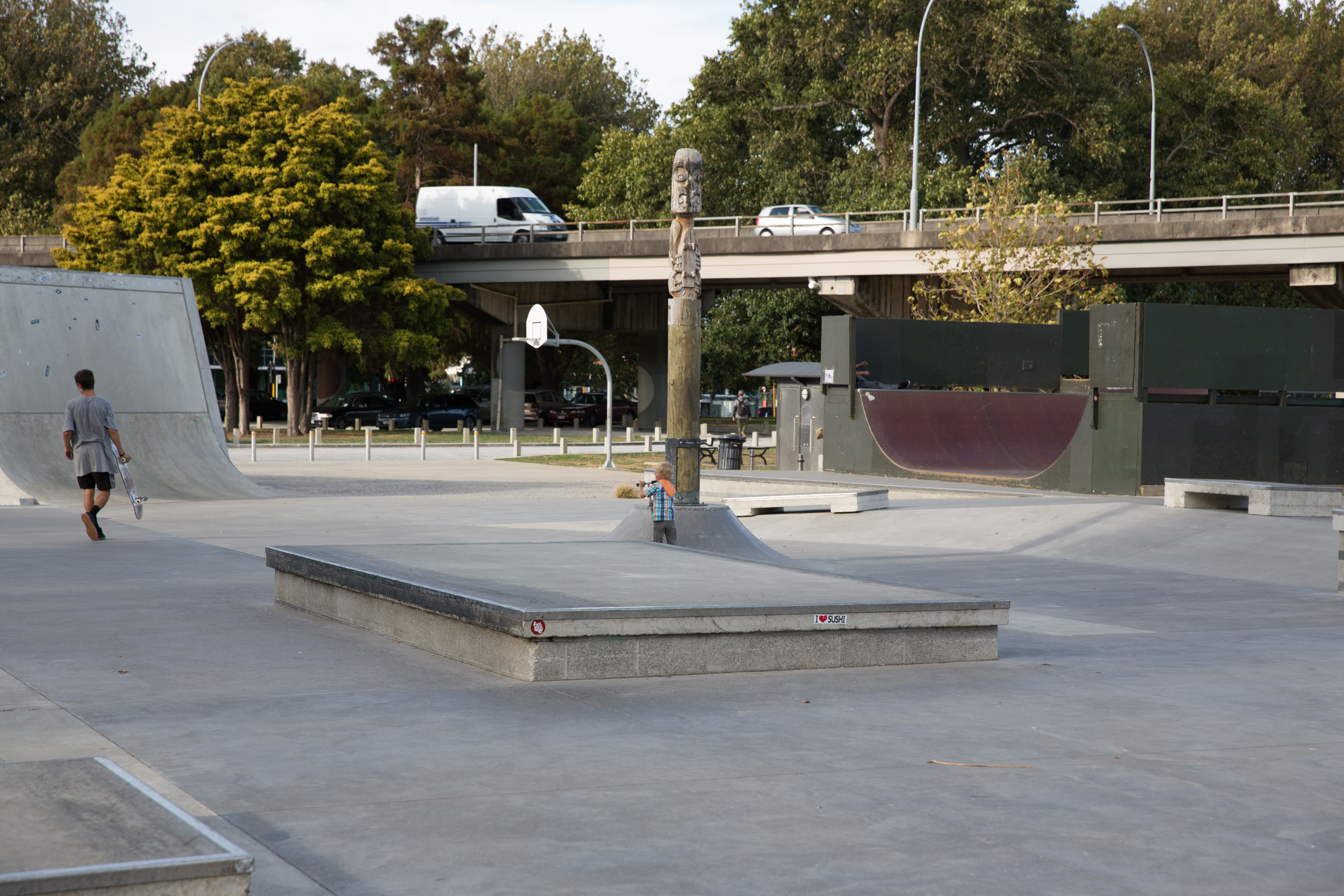
Te Mau Mahara, a 1999 sculpture by Ralph located at the skateboard park at Victoria Park, Auckland

Ralph is Māori and affiliated with the iwi Te Rarawa. Ralph began skateboarding around the age of seven in the late 1970s in Auckland before moving to Lower Hutt where he met Gregor Rankine, a skateboarder who mentored Ralph. Ralph traveled to Australia in 1986, winning competitions, establishing a profile including appearing on a 60 Minutes special on skateboarding. Ralph went to the US later that year to compete in skateboarding. Gaining sponsorship by Vision Skateboards, Ralph was deported from the US on immigration and work permit issues, effectively truncating his international career.

In 1999, Ralph carved a pouwhenua, Te Mau Mahara, incorporated into the skateboard and BMX course built at Victoria Park, Auckland. Ralph's carving depicts a figure holding a skateboard.

== Recent appreciation ==
There have been various profiles on Ralph in the years since and most recently, Alex Dyer and Lindsay Knight have produced an eight-episode documentary series on Lee's life and skateboarding career. Ralph's story is now being developed for a new American New Zealand production for television. In May 2026, Ralph was inducted into the Skateboarding Hall of Fame.
