= Paul Frank Limited =

American lifestyle products company

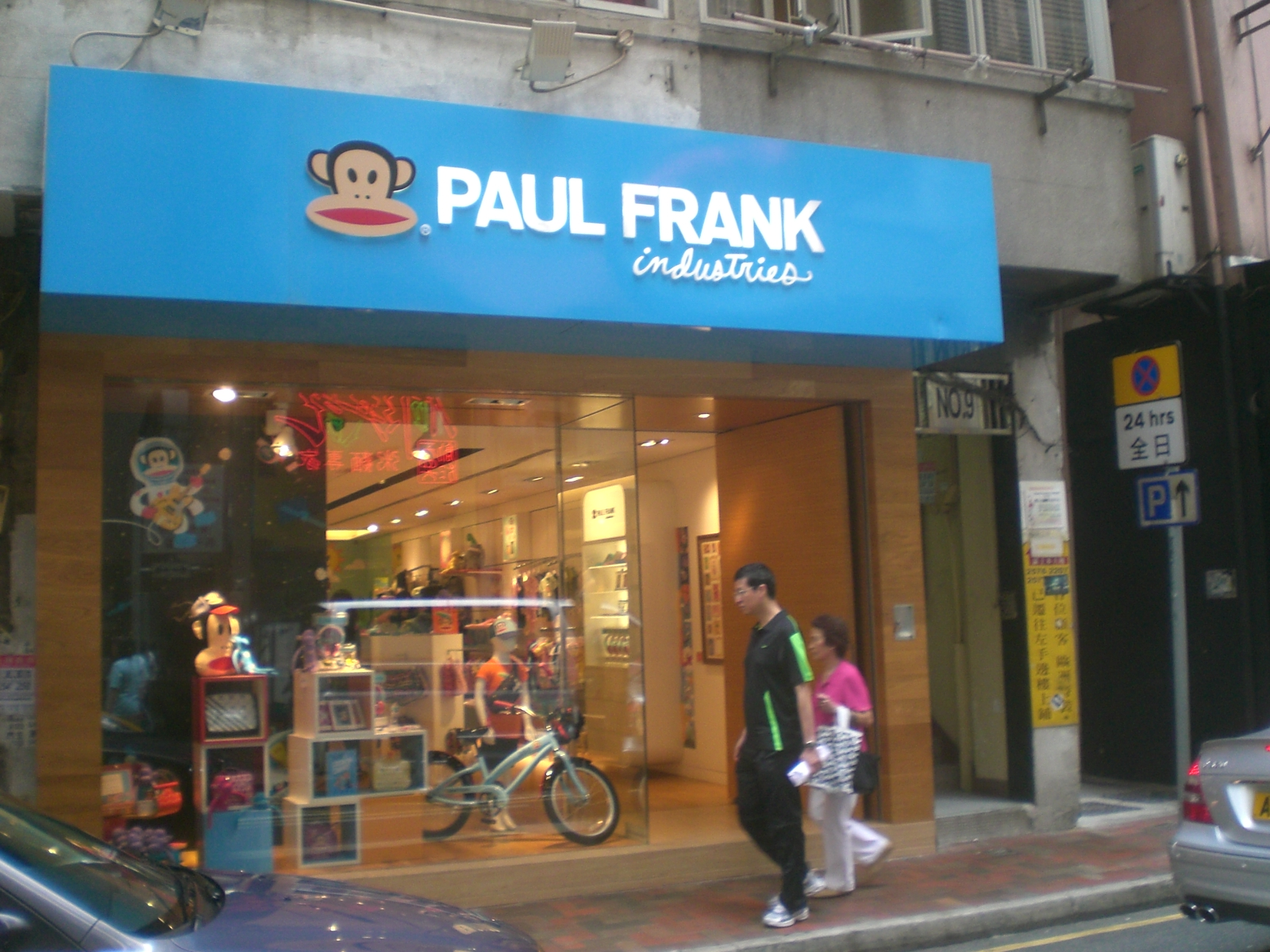
- Paul Frank Industries shop in Hong Kong
- Founded: 1995, Huntington Beach, California
- Founder: Paul Frank
- Headquarters: Hong Kong
- Key people: Paul Frank (original artist and creator of Julius and Friends)
- Products: Apparel
- Parent: Futurity Brands
- Website: www.paulfrank.com

Paul Frank Limited is a U.S.-based lifestyle products company, selling apparel and accessories. The company is owned by Futurity Brands AG, a subsidiary of Futurity Brands Limited as of 2020.

== History ==
=== Creator ===
Born on August 29, 1967, in Downey, California, Paul Frank Sunich, better known as Paul Frank, is an artist, fashion designer and cartoonist from the United States. In the 1990s, Frank studied art and fashion design in California at Orange Coast College.

=== Company ===
In 1995, Paul Frank was 28 years old, worked at a newsstand, and lived at home with his parents in Huntington Beach, California. For Christmas that year, he received a Singer sewing machine and began making kitschy gifts like wallets for friends by using Naugahyde—a type of vinyl—and vibrantly colored cotton. As a result, the company was founded that year as a partnership between Paul Frank and two local businessmen: Ryan Heuser and John Oswald, making vinyl accessories in a garage as gifts for their friends. From there, the wallets and handbags became a local sensation. The firm was formally incorporated in 1998 and has since grown into a global brand with its own stores called Paul Frank Industries.

On November 8, 2005, Frank left the company but remained a stockholder. The sudden controversy resulted in a lawsuit. Frank was pushed out of Paul Frank Industries in 2005 by his partners and soon was in court the next year suing Heuser and Oswald over the rights to Julius the Monkey and other cartoon images. In 2007, it was decided that all intellectual property in the business belonged to Paul Frank Industries. Oswald left the company and Heuser stayed on. Heuser later left to found athletic apparel brand Athletic Recon. On August 17, 2010, Paul Frank Industries was purchased by Saban Brands, owner of the Power Rangers franchise. The company closed the last Orange County office in Costa Mesa, moving Julius and his friends to Los Angeles on September 27, 2012. Since 2005, Frank has spent his time as a design teacher and fine artist. His new brand, PF Workshop, is a studio that allows him to create innovative and entertaining characters with a personal approach. His new collection of fashion includes T-shirts, handbags, wallets and many other accessories – all designed by Frank himself.

However, on February 6, 2016, Saban Brands announced the appointment of artist and designer Paul Frank as Director of Creative Development for the company. In his new position at Saban Brands, Frank serves as a key player for Paul Frank Industries and brings authenticity back to the brand, while also working on new character development and other content for additional properties in the Saban Brands portfolio.

Paul Frank Limited was formed in 2020 by Futurity Brands, a licensing company based in Hong Kong to purchase the intellectual property rights to the Paul Frank brand and its characters.

== Products ==
The company continues to design products intended to reflect the original ethos from the garage days - applying themes from music, art and pop culture with an influence from mid-century design into everyday objects. The company's iconic character, a monkey called Julius, is featured on many of their products, which are available through multiple retailers and their own stores. There are shops in Los Angeles, Athens, New York, Chicago, Las Vegas, San Francisco, Dallas, London, Amsterdam, Berlin, Bangkok, Hong Kong, etc.

Paul Frank Industries store locations around the world.

== Philanthropy ==
Paul Frank Industries is involved with various philanthropic endeavors that directly benefit children, the arts and the environment. They have partnered with Festival of Children, Boarding for Breast Cancer, The Elton John AIDS Foundation, First Book and The Children's Hospital of Los Angeles. The company has collaborated with several bands that adore his experimental work, such as Gorilla Biscuits, Pretty Girls Make Graves, The Aquabats, Tool, Atreyu, Alkaline Trio, The Vandals, Radiohead, Every Time I Die, Eighteen Visions and Bad Religion. This is not the end to the list, other musical and design partnerships that he has worked with include Lollapalooza, the Coachella Festival and KROQ-FM, a radio station from L.A.

Apart from the above alliances, Paul Frank has worked with companies and artists as well, like Wahoo's Fish Taco, John Deere, ProKeds, Hello Kitty, Lego, Nintendo, Thomas Campbell, Mark Ryden, Skullcandy, Nirve Bicycles, SHAG, Andy Warhol, Oscar Mayer, Nissin, Funko, and Mattel.
