= Love the Beast =

- DVD cover
- Directed by: Eric Bana
- Produced by: Eric Bana; Matt Hill; Peter Hill
- Starring: Eric Bana; Jay Leno; Dr. Phil; Jeremy Clarkson; Tony Ramunno; Andrew "Temps" Templeton; Jack Vukoja
- Cinematography: Rod Pollard; David Rose
- Edited by: Conor O'Neill
- Music by: Yuri Worontschak
- Release date: 12 March 2009
- Running time: 92 minutes
- Country: Australia
- Language: English

Love the Beast is a 2009 documentary film directed by Eric Bana, and featuring Bana, Jay Leno, Jeremy Clarkson, and Phil McGraw. It was listed as one of the best automotive documentaries by The News Wheel in 2015.

== Synopsis ==
The film documents the 25-year history of Eric Bana's first car, a 1974 Ford XB Falcon Hardtop that he purchased at the age of fifteen for A$1100. In this film, Eric explores the central role that fixing and racing this car has played in his life and the lives of his friends. He describes it as being, "like a campfire for me and my mates". Celebrities Jay Leno, Dr. Phil and Jeremy Clarkson offer opinions on the emotional attachments that some people form with automobiles.

== Box office ==
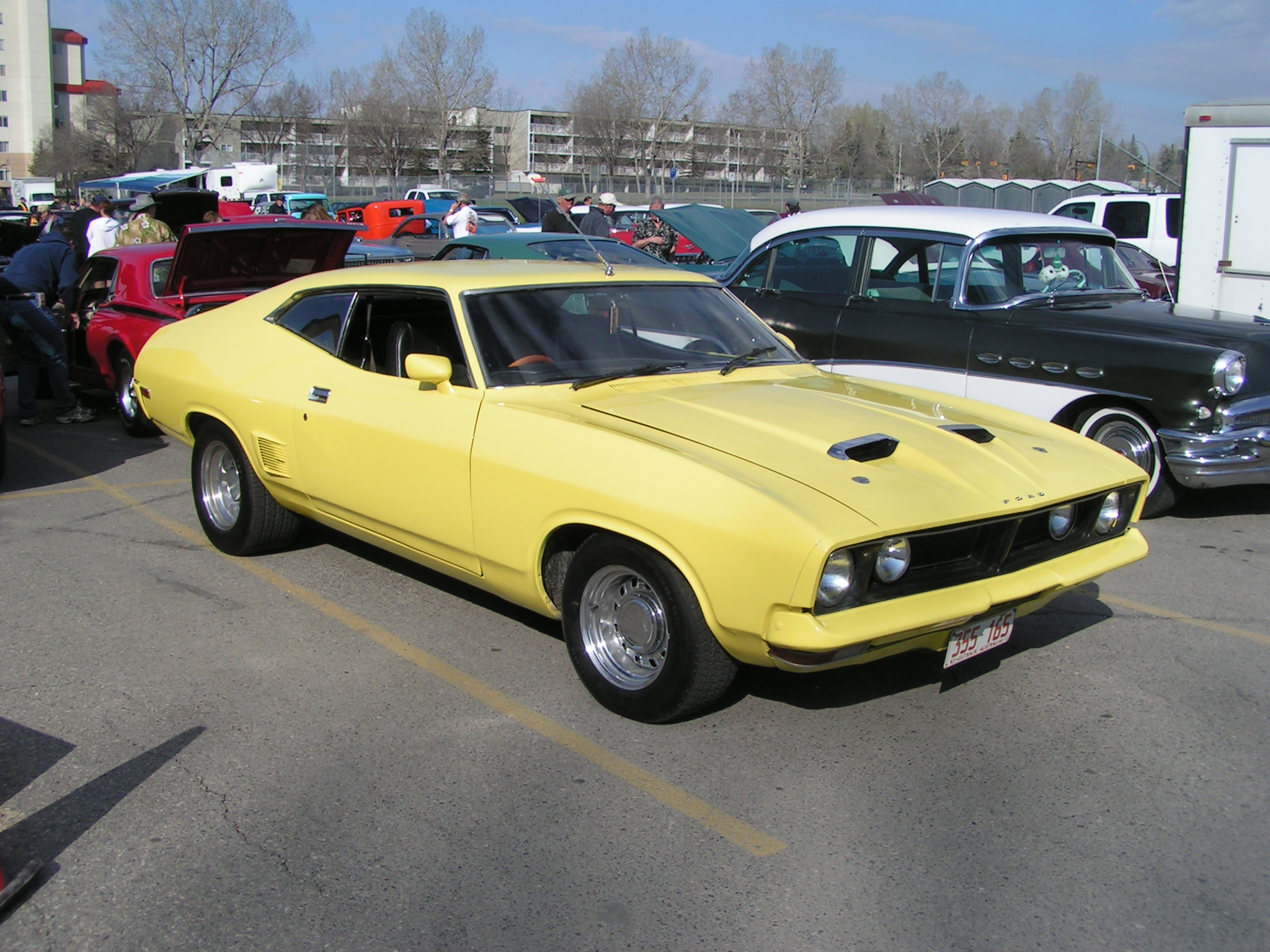
Ford XB Falcon Hardtop, similar to Bana's "Beast"

Love The Beast grossed $777,351 at the box office in Australia.

== See also ==
- Cinema of Australia
- Targa Tasmania
