= Stüssy =

American clothing brand and private company

Stüssy, Inc
- Type: Private
- Industry: Retail
- Founded: 1980s in Laguna Beach, California, U.S.
- Founder: Shawn Stussy
- Headquarters: Irvine, California, U.S.
- Number of locations: 25 Stüssy-branded stores, and 4 third-party retail stores (2022)
- Area served: North America; Asia; Europe; Australasia
- Products: Apparel
- Owner: The Sinatra family
- Website: Official website

Stüssy (/ˈstuːsi/) is an American privately held fashion house founded in the early 1980s by Shawn Stussy. It benefited from the surfwear trend which began in Orange County, California, and was later adopted by the skateboard and hip-hop scenes.

== History ==
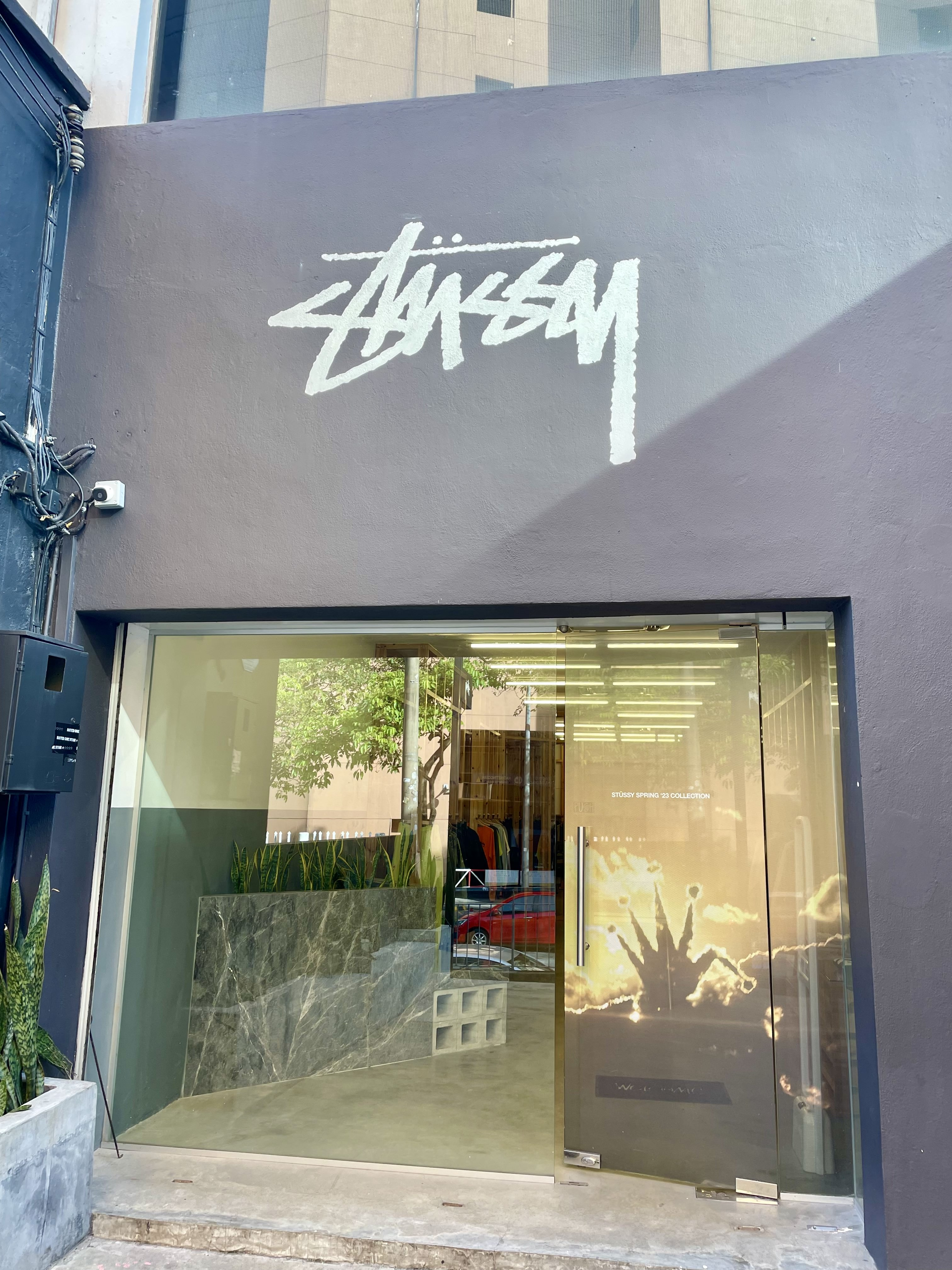
Stüssy store in Kuala Lumpur, Malaysia, permanently closed its doors on March 31, 2025.

Shawn Stussy (born 1954) was a manufacturer of surfboards in California. The logo defining the brand started in the early 1980s, when he scrawled his surname on handcrafted boards with a simple broad-tipped marker. He then used the logo on T-shirts, shorts and caps which he sold out of his car around Laguna Beach, California. The signature was derived from his uncle, Jan Stussy's signature. A stylized "S" popular in the 1990s, called the "Cool S", is often mistakenly attributed to the brand.

In 1984, Stussy and his friend, Frank Sinatra Jr. (no relation to the singer of the same name), partnered to sell the apparel. The company expanded into Europe by 1988, opened a boutique in SoHo, Manhattan in New York and unveiled multiple locations throughout the 1990s. Revenues were as high as $17 million in 1991 and $20 million in 1992. Stüssy was sold throughout the United States at both specialty and department stores alongside other high-priced "California lifestyle" clothing. Outside of the US, the brand was available in specialty shops alongside high-end international design clothing.

In 1996, Stussy resigned as president and Sinatra bought his share of the company holdings. As of 2017, the Sinatra family owns the brand. According to the company's website, DJ the apparel is available in branded stores and other retailers in Europe, Asia, the United States, Canada, and Australia.

== Style ==
The early success of the brand has been attributed to its popularity in the hip hop and skateboarding/surfer scenes. The brand was also embraced by the punk and other subcultures. In a New York Times interview in June 1992, Stussy said, "Everybody calls it surf wear, or urban streetwear graffiti, punk, or surf street... I don't name it, and I don't name it on purpose."

=== Collaborations ===
In 2011, Marvel paired up with Stüssy for an extensive line split between the companies. The first, released on April 27, had nine T-shirt designs depicting several of the comics' most popular superheroes combined with Stüssy's graphic language. The second was made of designs from nine guest artists who interpreted their favorite characters from the Marvel Universe. In 2019, Stüssy and fashion designer Matthew Williams partnered and released a garment dyed T-shirt made of recycled organic cotton and a pair of co-branded leather hiking boots. In 2020, Williams announced a new partnership with the brand for denim products and in late 2020, the brand partnered Fuz EL Seed with CDG, a Japanese brand to create a capsule collection in commemoration of Stüssy's 40th anniversary. In 2025, Nike and Stüssy released limited edition boots and apparel including the Baltoro boot, which was initially part of the brand’s ACG (All Conditions Gear) line and was originally released in 1990. It is known for the use of vivid colors.
