= Dunlop KT-26 =

Running shoe

The Dunlop KT26 was a running shoe made by Dunlop Sport (Australia), from 1978 to 2012. Originally designed by Jerry Stubberfield for the Osaga shoe company in the 1970s, "KT" was short for "Kinetic Technology" (or Kinetic Training) and "26" represents the number of miles in a marathon. The shoe featured a lightweight upper, wedge shape and wide flared sole to spread impact and increase traction and a hard-wearing rubber sole with a tread pattern of "cantilevered" large deep lugs and voids which provided 360° grip edges and was relatively self-cleaning, making it useful in wet and muddy conditions. In 2003, Dunlop Footwear calculated it had sold more than 5 million pairs since its release.

Versions were made in synthetic with suede, full suede and vinyl uppers and with lace up or Velcro tab closing. A version, the Dunlop KT Centurion, was made for the Australian Defence Forces. Dunlop KT Walker shoes, in leather or canvas uppers, used the same wedge and sole design. Dunlop Footwear later made a "safety" version with a steel toe cap. Dunlop KT26 Osaka was a specialty line. The Dunlop KT XLC is a cheaper, lighter and fully synthetic variation.

In addition to sport and recreational uses, the KT26 became a standard clothing issue item for many Australian factory workers and was widely used by construction and other outdoor workers. The KT26 was a standard issue shoe for inmates in Australian correctional facilities. A modified version of the shoe featuring velcro instead of laces was common in maximum security facilities while laces were still permitted for inmates in minimum security jail. Its sole tread pattern made it a choice for bushwalking, canoeing, rafting and rock fishing where it was also valued for its low saturated weight and quick drying.

== History ==
=== 1970s—1980s ===
The KT-26 was developed in the late 1970s by Jerry Stubberfield in Portland, Oregon, United States. Stubberfield came up with the concept of Kinetic Technology and developed the unique bio-kinetic lugged sole for the OSAGA shoe company. Osaga got into financial difficulty and closed its doors by the start of the 1980s.

Stubberfield then started Avia (which later became the fourth-largest sport footwear company). Avia acquired the patent and design rights to the KT-26 from Osaga. Stubberfield then sold the brand Avia to Reebok in 1987 for US$180 million.

Dunlop Sport Australia first came across the KT26 shoe at the NYC Shoe Fair in the late 1970s. An agreement to purchase the shoe was arranged thanks to the son-in-law of the Osaga shoe company being friends with an employee of Dunlop Sport Australia. DSA then purchased ownership rights to the KT26 design (with a 10-year royalty agreement with Stubberfield). The KT-26 was then redeveloped to become the Dunlop KT26 which was in continuous production from 1978 to 2012 (with minor pattern changes to the upper & revised sole lug pattern with added forefoot section).

=== 1990s—2000s ===
The KT26 remained unchanged for decades while competitor brands changed their designs, materials and constructions and used built-in obsolescence and short product life cycle marketing. This enabled the KT26 to establish a consumer following but it also became dated in the minds of many retailers. Dunlop Footwear's marketing of the KT26 resulted in it becoming dependent on a few major discount department store retailers (DDS) of KMART, Target, Big W etc. for retail of the KT26 at a time when the Internet gradually eroded all retail stores' share of footwear sales and many footwear chains and shops closed. At the same time the DDS retailers were also producing and retailing their own 'home brand' sports shoes. To remain viable in the DDS market space, Dunlop Footwear's primary focus was cost reduction with no brand or promotional activities. Cost pressures saw the production of the KT26 moved offshore to China in the late 1990s and moved between Chinese factories for the next decade to find the cheapest per unit production price. As a result, the quality of the KT26 suffered and the famed fit/last shape varied depending on the factory at the time. Product returns and customer complaints accelerated the KT26's demise and during 2011, all major DDS retailers had dropped or were in the process of dropping the KT26 from their footwear offerings.

=== 2010s— Demise of original KT26 ===
In an attempt to revive the KT26, Daniel Stewart, a footwear designer who had been involved in the 2012 Dunlop Volley International redevelopment project, began work on revised KT26 designs and a business case to relaunch this iconic running shoe. This was an 'after hours' project as there was no interest from Pacific Brands management to salvage the Dunlop Footwear business after the sale of the Volley brand. Stewart made contact with Jerry Stubberfield and key Dunlop footwear personnel from the 1980s and 1990s to uncover the history and heritage of the KT26 shoe.

The 2012 revised KT26 was given approval by Pacific Brands management to proceed from concepts to production ready. Two of the three main DDS retailers bought into the revamped range which featured the KT26 in new look colours in men's, women's and children's fits. A special 'PNG' colour design sold over 200,000 units alone in Papua New Guinea. The revised KT26 range created a small spike in sales for the first year. However, Dunlop Footwear's failure to invest its brand hastened the revised KT26's slide from retail market. Dunlop Footwear sold the KT XLC, a fully synthetic entry price point version, alongside and in competition with the KT26.

The 2012 revised KT26 design featured the original last shape and some design elements from the OSAGA and first model KT26 shoes. The new shoe had a revised construction and materials. The mid sole was revised from an EVA wedge to an injection moulded pylon.

However, in final production, the outsole featured a new 3D concave shape, supposedly to improve impact absorption. The revised KT26 had much smaller and fewer lugs on the sole which wore more quickly and provided fewer and smaller edges for grip and was made of a harder plastic rubber that did not mould to surfaces as well as the original KT26 sole. The fundamental changes made to the design of the sole and tread pattern were not successful. The sole was no longer a hard wearing rubber and the tread pattern no longer featured wide deep lugs, resulting in reduced surface and edges in contact with the ground and was far inferior in grip in cold or wet conditions to the original KT26 sole. Contrary to the suggestion that the 3D concave outsole shape would improve impact absorption, the tread surface of sole was narrowed reducing traction, the spread of impact and causing dangerous foot rollover. The new shoe, while labelled KT26, did not have a KT26 sole and was an entirely different shoe. The revised KT26 was marketed as a "Sole Revival" but the entirely new sole and shoe was the demise of the real KT26.

In November 2014, Pacific Brands sold its Dunlop Sport Australia and Slazenger brands to International Brand Management & Licensing (IBML), a division of Sports Direct International plc. based in the United Kingdom, which already owned the Dunlop and Slazenger brands in every other market except Australia and New Zealand. Sports Direct continues to manufacture & sell the revised "KT26" models and introduced yet another fast wearing sole with a different tread pattern on some lines.

== In popular culture ==
Melbourne hip hop artist, Billy Bunks released a track titled KT-26s where he raps several verses about the shoe.
