= Holeproof Hosiery =

American textile firm

Holeproof Hosiery was a Milwaukee, Wisconsin textile firm that was founded in 1901. The business was built primarily through earnings which were left to aggregate in the company. Its advertising expenses exceeded $500,000 after 1901, making it a brand name recognized worldwide. The business produced men's and women's hosiery, underwear, lingerie, and men's pajamas. From 1916 - 1925 Holeproof Hosiery sales increased from $2,037,000 to $9,220,000. Net sales totaled $24,435,342 in 1954.

== Company chronology ==
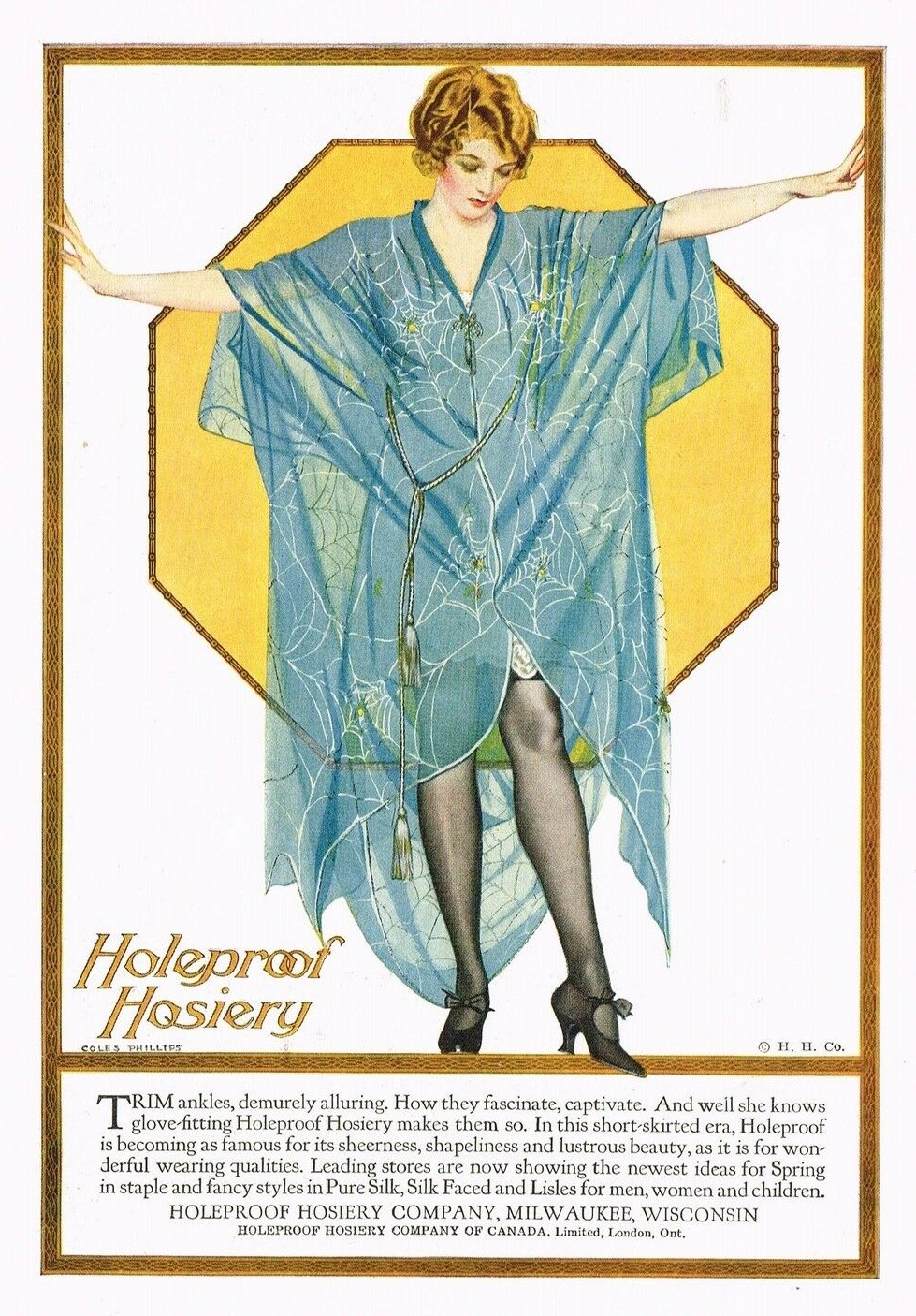
Holeproof Hosiery ad, painted by Coles Phillips (1921)

The first president of the company was Edward Freshl.

In October 1928 the corporation was sued by Gotham Hosiery, which charged Holeproof with a patent infringement. At the time Gotham Hosiery controlled the Pointex patents for manufacture of pointed heel hosiery by virtue of the company's purchase of Onyx Hosiery, some years earlier.

Holeproof Hosiery began making nylon hosiery in January 1940, starting production on 8 of its 230 machines. The hose were made of a synthetic yarn composed of derivatives of coal and iron manufactured by Du Pont. As a competitive move Holeproof Hosiery reduced prices on its nylons by up to 15% in December 1956.

Holeproof Hosiery was made a division of Julius Kayser & Company after it was acquired for $13 million in August 1955. Kayser manufactured ladies gloves, lingerie, and hosiery. Holeproof's fixed assets were absorbed by Kayser during a five-year period concluding on June 30, 1960.

== Australia ==
In the late 1920s, a successful hosiery manufacturer, Staley & Staley Ltd, started making ladies hosiery under licence from the Holeproof Hosiery Company in Milwaukee, USA. The company went public in 1929 and opened the first Holeproof mill at Brunswick, Victoria in 1930, becoming the first manufacturer to produce and market Australian-made self-supporting socks. During the 1930s, Holeproof revolutionised the Australian market by promoting their products as a sought-after fashion accessory.

In 1969, Holeproof was acquired by Pacific Dunlop, and later became part of Pacific Brands when it was formed as the consumer goods section of that company. In 2016, Hanes Australasia became the owner of the brand after acquisition of Pacific Brands.
