= Tontine Group =

- Type: Manufacturer
- Founded: 1870
- Headquarters: Campbellfield, Victoria, Australia
- Products: Pillows
- Parent: John Cotton Group
- Website: https://www.tontine.com.au/

Tontine is an Australian manufacturer of pillows and quilts. The company can trace its origins back to 1870 when the Galt family commenced manufacturing in Melbourne. From 1984–2001 it was owned by Pacific Dunlop. The Tontine group was part of Pacific Brands until early 2017. Tontine is now owned by John Cotton Group. Until 2007 the company's manufacturing base was at East Brunswick, Victoria (it is now at Campbellfield in Victoria). Tontine Fibres is a division of United Bonded Fabrics a separate company manufacturing polyester insulation, air filtration, carpet underlays, geotextiles and a range of mattress and furniture comfort products and using the Tontine trademark under license.

The company began making flock and soft bedding. Tontine has been making pillows since 1956. In 1963 the company "launched" the first polyester filled pillow in Australia.

The company is the leading pillow producer in Australia manufacturing half of all pillows sold in Australia. Tontine manufactures pillows under its own brands and also under house brands for retailers. In 2002 it produced 3.6 million pillows per year. A former general manager of Tontine claimed that "Tontine is unique in the world because it is a strong pillow brand in what is a commodity market," she said. "In other countries there is no market leader because manufacturers tended to stay in their local areas."

As the company is well known, it is referenced in jokes. For example, an Australian legal newsletter said of an alleged swindler who padded his timesheets "that at one stage pillow makers Tontine were said to be interested in sponsoring him."

Duvets in Australia are known by the genericised trademark "Doona"; the brand name is owned by the Tontine Group. The brand name was acquired by Tontine in 1991 when Pacific Dunlop took over the Northern Feather company which until that time had been one of Australia's largest manufacturers of feather and down-filled pillows and quilts.
