= Kawasan Falls =

Waterfalls in Badian, Cebu

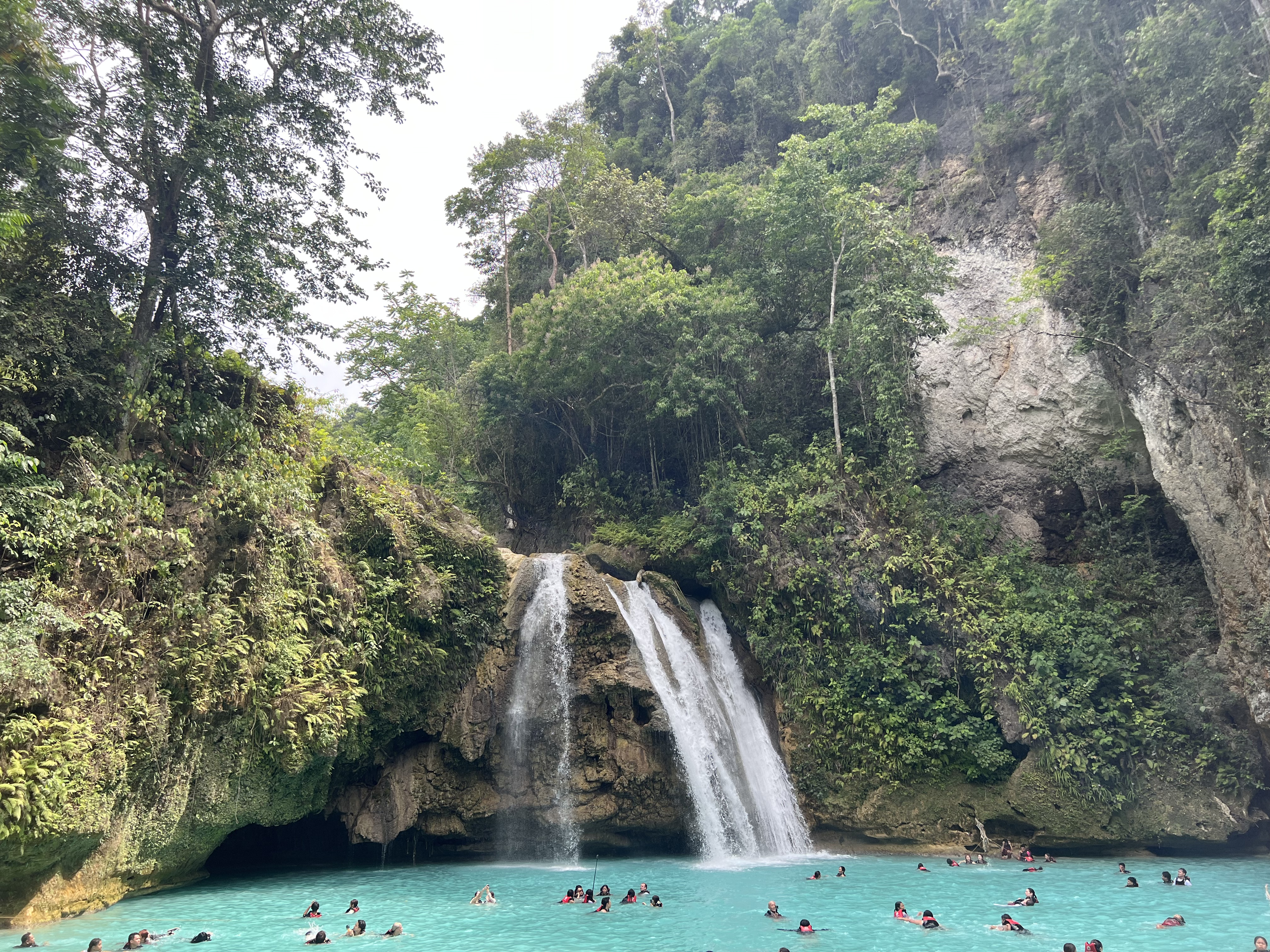
- The first stage (Level 1) of the falls in Badian, Cebu
- Interactive map of Kawasan Falls
- Location: Badian, Cebu
- Coordinates: 9°48′N 123°22′E
- Type: Plunge
- Total height: 40 m (130 ft)
- Watercourse: Kawasan River

The Kawasan Falls is a three-stage cascade of clear turquoise water from mountain springs located in the jungles of the Cebu island. The falls are part of the Kawasan River in Badian, Cebu, in the Philippines. The water from the falls originates from the Kabukalan Spring and passes through the Kawasan gorge en route to the Matutinao River and the Tanon Strait. The largest waterfall is about 40 meters high, followed by smaller cascades and turquoise water pools that invite swimming. It is a popular tourist destination and is known for its tranquil and relaxing environment, and the adventurous can even enjoy a raft ride or a dive off cliffs.

== Tourism ==
Access to the falls was temporarily halted in 2023 by the Cebu Provincial Government with revocation of permits to unlicensed canyoneering operators. Tour operations reopened in October of 2023 after three months of rehabilitation, including professionalization efforts of tour guides.

== Maintenance ==
In June 2026, the Cebu provincial government has allocated P110 million for the rehabilitation of the Kawasan Falls. Rehabilitation efforts will include restoration of the environmental integrity of the falls, improvement of safety measures, and strengthening of the site’s resilience against future challenges.

== Geography ==
Kawasan Falls is part of the Matutinao River canyon.

== Gallery ==
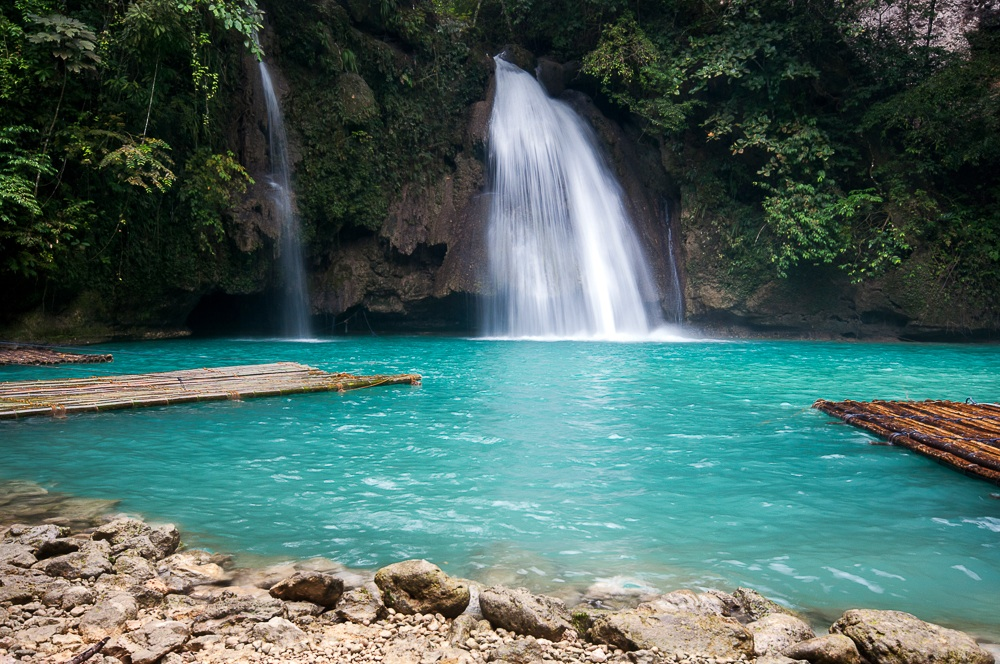

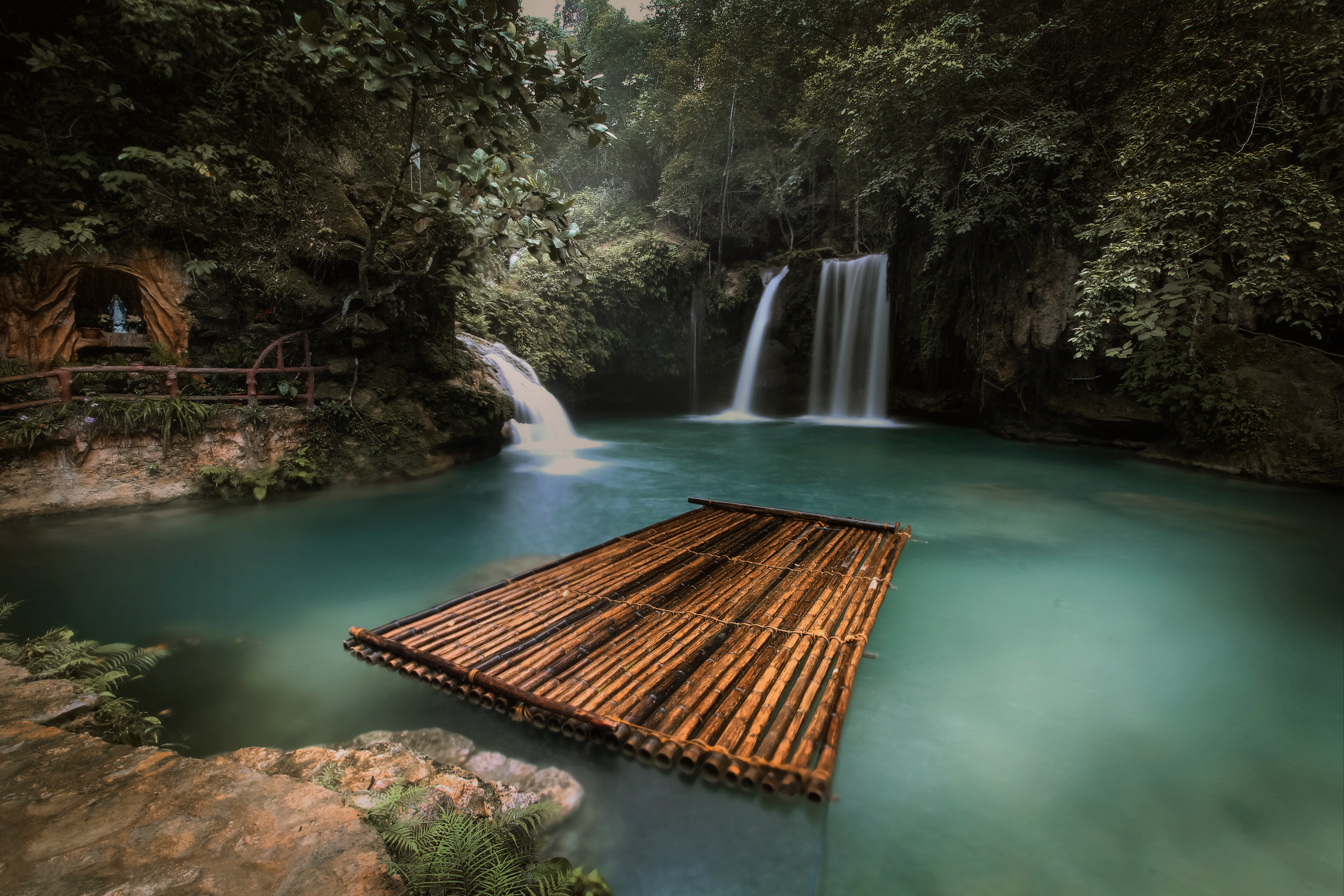

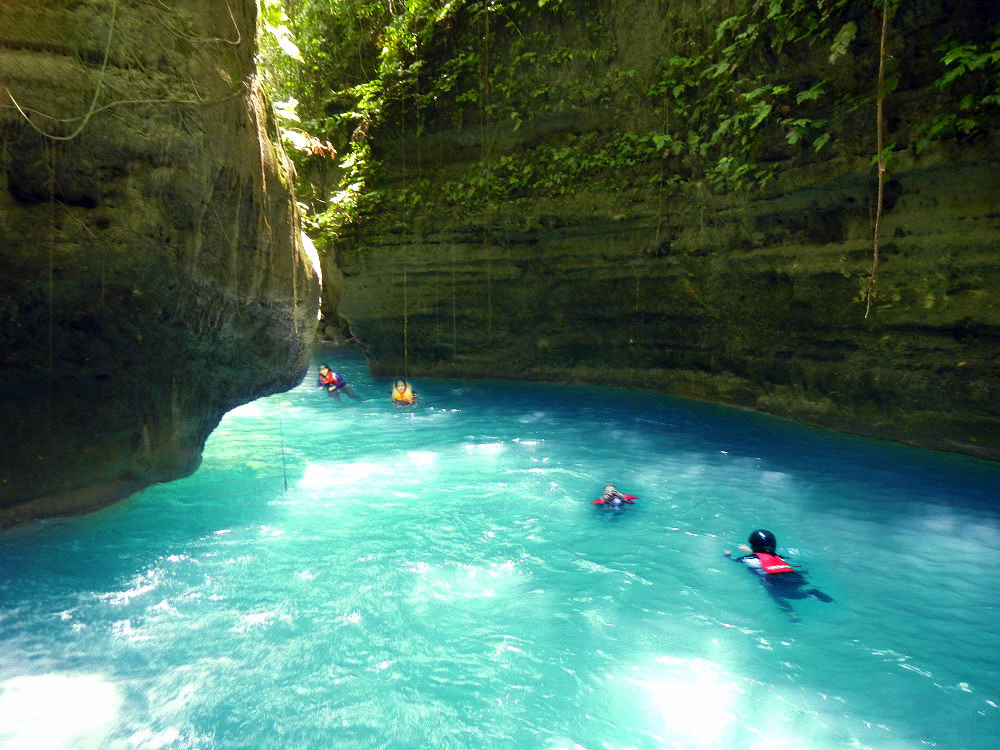

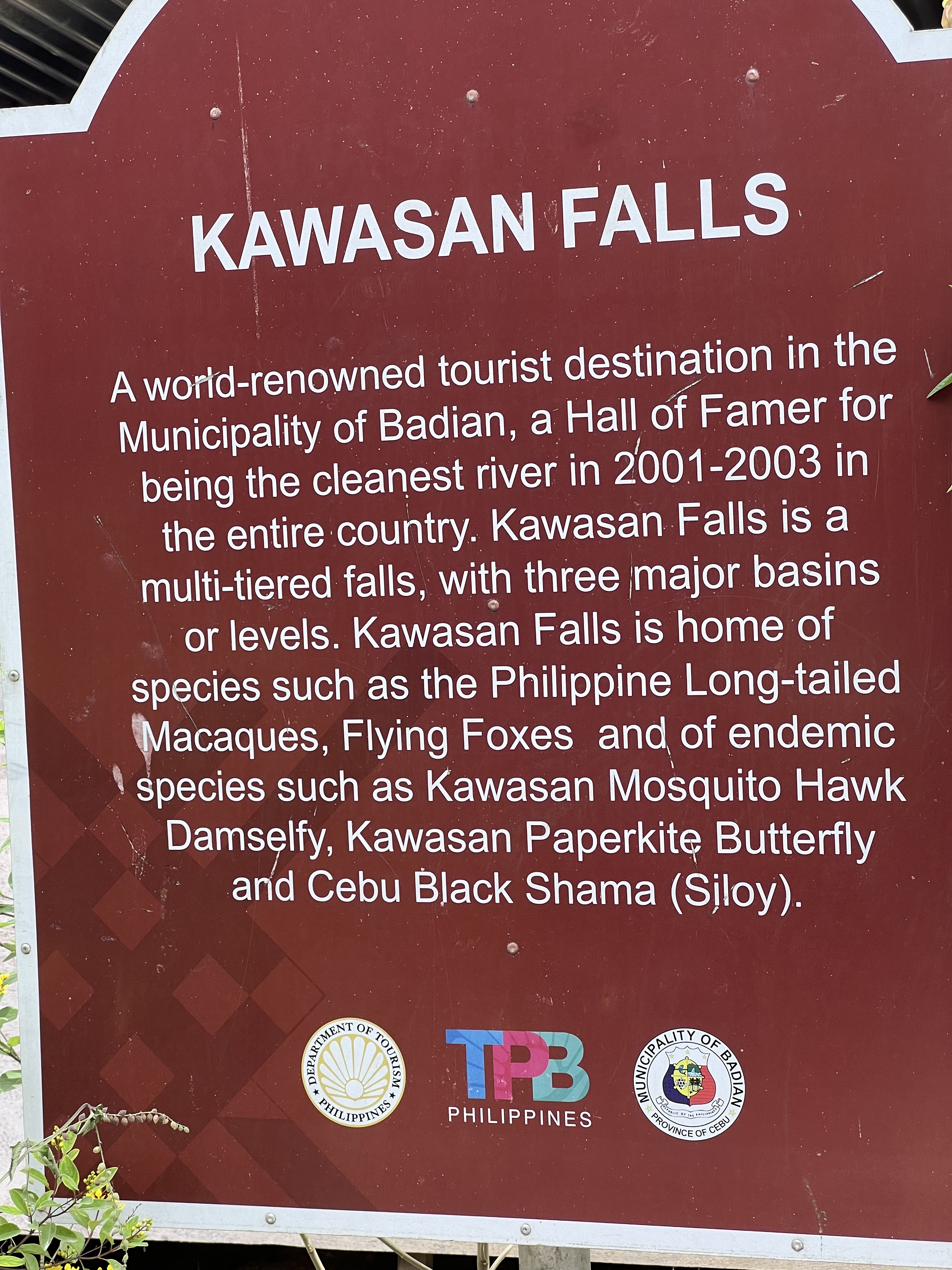
Information sign

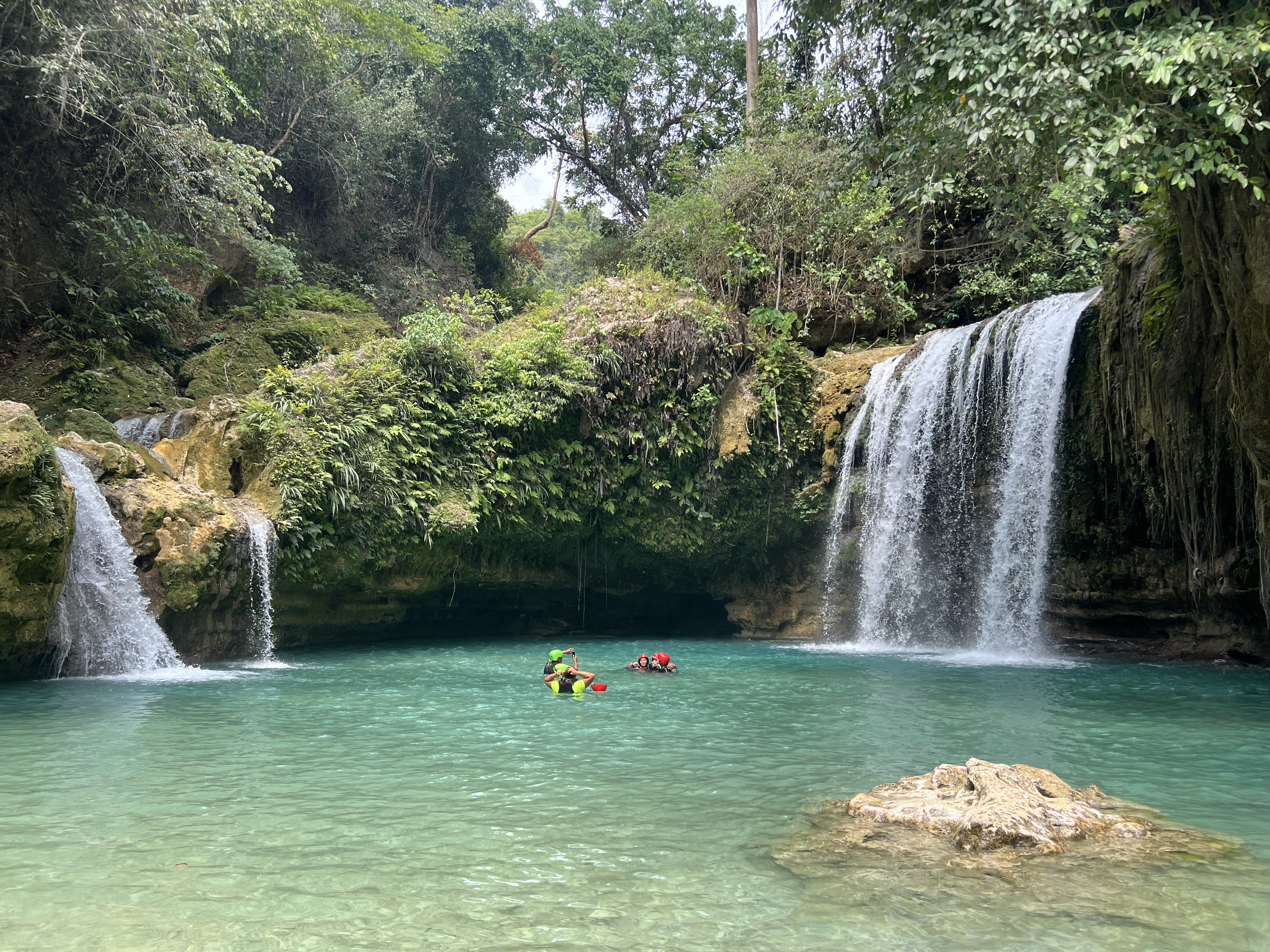
The second stage (Level 2)

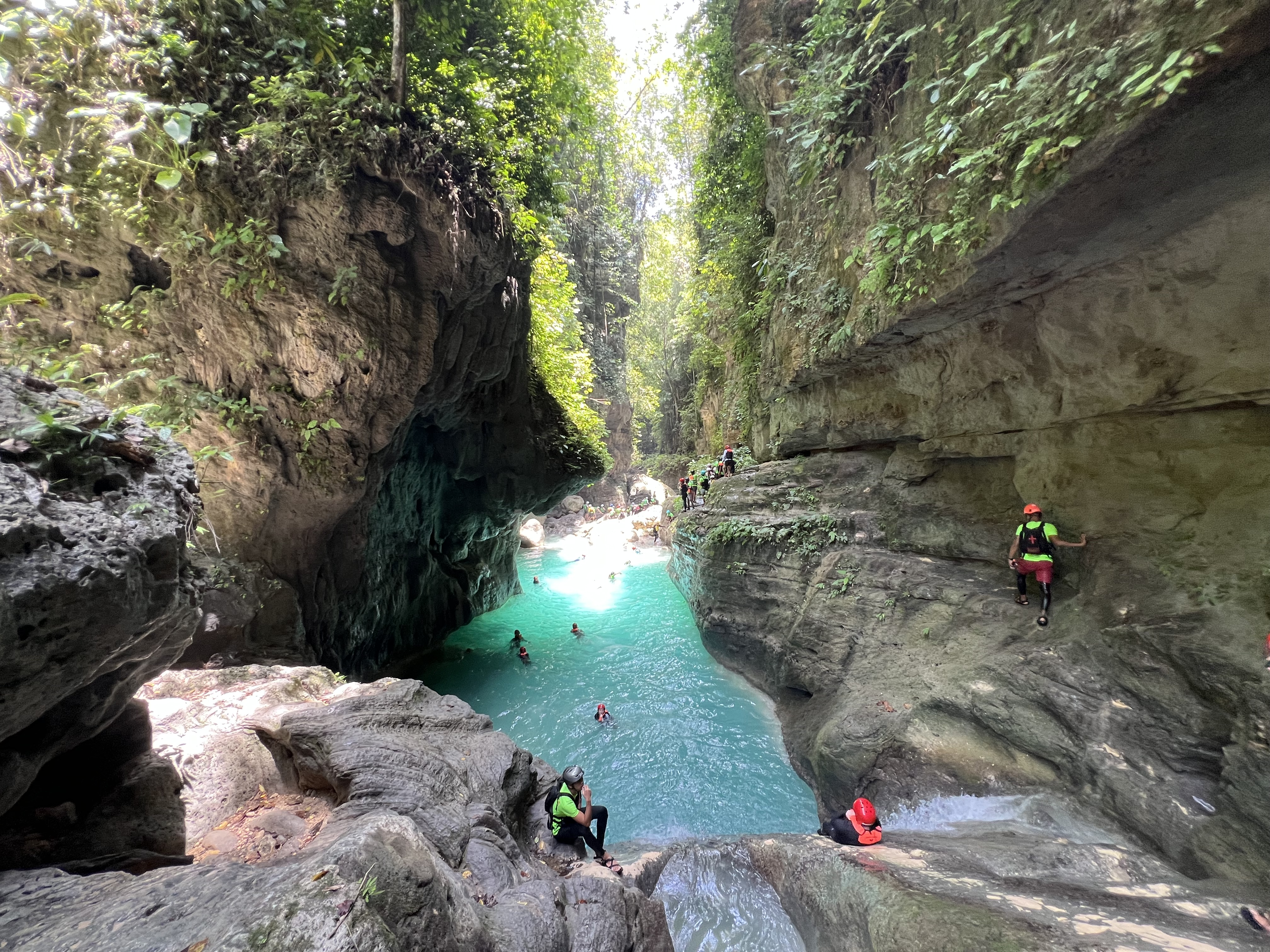
Kawasan River Canyon
