= Badian, Cebu =

Municipality in Cebu, Philippines

Badian
- Municipality
- Municipality of Badian
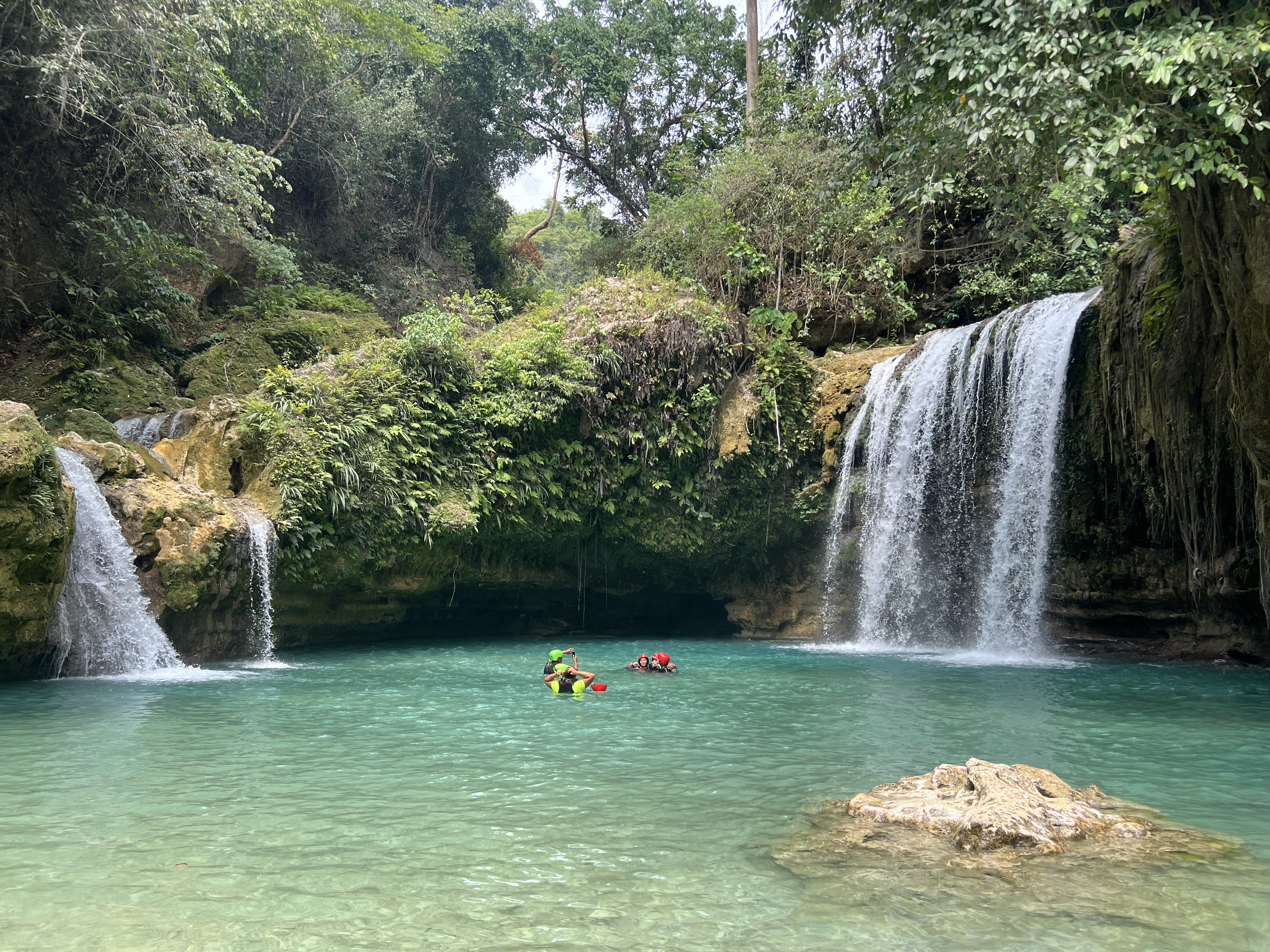
- Sunset at the Badian highlands Kawasan Falls Lambug Beach

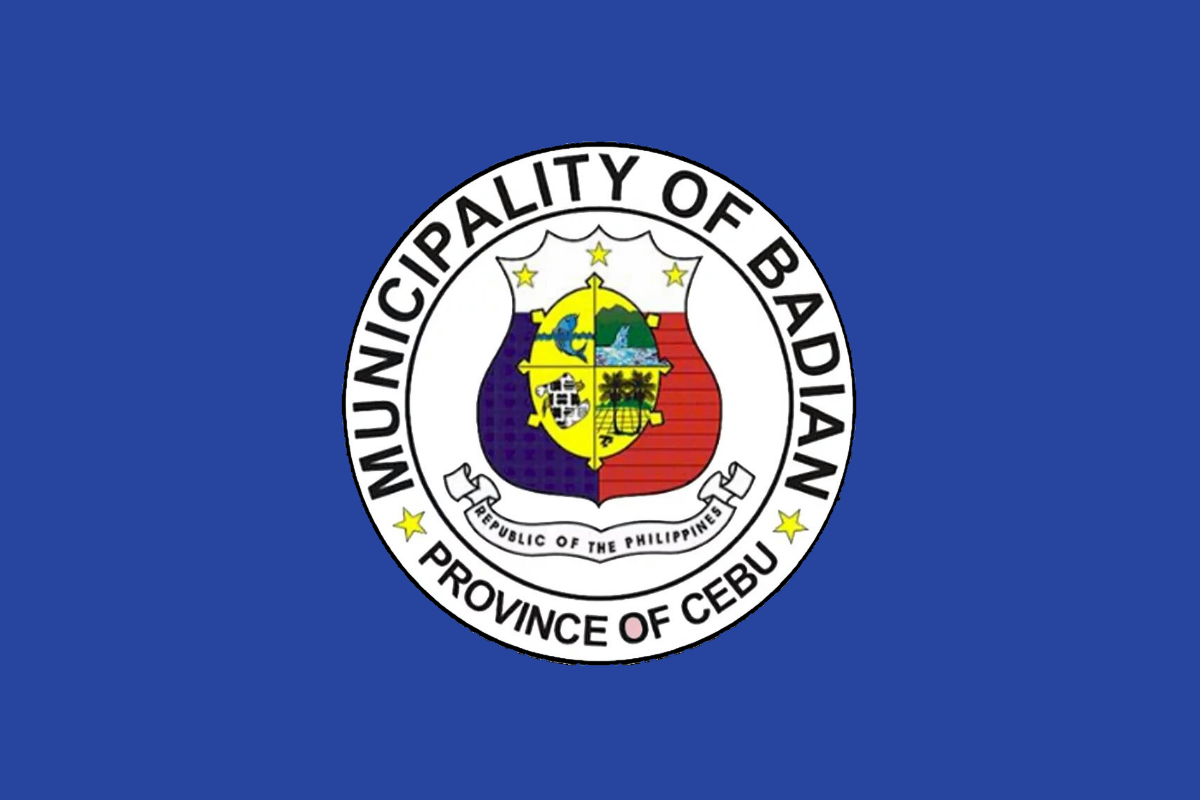
- Flag
- Anthem: Badian, O lungsod ko
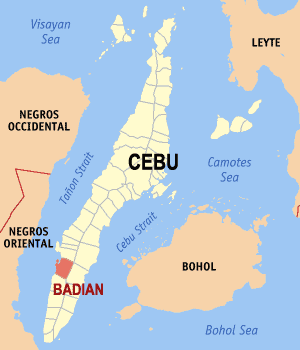
- Map of Cebu with Badian highlighted
- Interactive map of Badian
- Location within the Philippines
- Coordinates: 9°52′10″N 123°23′45″E
- Country: Philippines
- Region: Central Visayas
- Province: Cebu
- District: 7th district
- Founded: 1825
- Barangays: 29 (see Barangays)

Government
  - Type: Sangguniang Bayan
  - Mayor: Jerome Christian V. Librando (1st term)
  - Vice Mayor: Doris M. Silvano (2nd Term)
  - Representative: Patricia Calderon
  - Municipal Council: Members: Michelle Bitangga (1st Term); Carmencita Lumain (former Mayor); Maricar Lumain (2nd Term); Joseph Balbona (2nd Term); Kyrene Vesta Tabanao (3rd Term); Marites Gramatica (1st Term); Julius Agravante (1st Term); Jim Amarado (1st Term)
  - Electorate: 29,459 voters (2025)

Area
  - Total: 110.07 km^{2} (42.50 sq mi)
- Elevation: 139 m (456 ft)
- Highest elevation: 1,014 m (3,327 ft)
- Lowest elevation: 0 m (0 ft)

Population (2024 census)
  - Total: 44,626
  - Density: 405.43/km^{2} (1,050.1/sq mi)
  - Households: 10,479

Economy
  - Income class: 1st municipal income class
  - Poverty incidence: 29.15% (2023)
  - Revenue: ₱ 662.3 million (2024)
  - Assets: ₱ 1,274 million (2024)
  - Expenditure: ₱ 133 million (2024)
  - Liabilities: ₱ 248.9 million (2024)

Service provider
  - Electricity: Cebu 1 Electric Cooperative (CEBECO 1)
- Time zone: UTC+8 (PST)
- ZIP code: 6031
- PSGC: 072207000
- IDD : area code: +63 (0)32
- Native languages: Cebuano; Tagalog

Badian, officially the Municipality of Badian (Cebuano: Lungsod sa Badian; Tagalog: Bayan ng Badian), is a municipality in the province of Cebu, Philippines. According to the 2024 census, it has a population of 44,626 people.

== Geography ==
Badian is bordered to the north by the town of Moalboal, to the west is the Tañon Strait, to the east is the town of Dalaguete, and to the south is the town of Alegria. It is 113 kilometres (70 mi) from Cebu City.

Badian is one of the eight municipalities comprising the 7th Congressional District Cebu Province.

=== Barangays ===
Badian is politically subdivided into 29 barangays. Each barangay consists of puroks and some have sitios.

PSGC	Barangay	Population			±% p.a.	
		2024		2010		
072207001	Alawijao	2.4%	1,078	1,075	▴	0.02%
072207002	Balhaan	0.9%	402	491	▾	−1.37%
072207003	Banhigan	5.8%	2,596	2,529	▴	0.18%
072207004	Basak	3.3%	1,487	1,843	▾	−1.47%
072207005	Basiao	2.2%	983	993	▾	−0.07%
072207006	Bato	2.6%	1,166	927	▴	1.60%
072207007	Bugas	6.0%	2,666	2,592	▴	0.19%
072207008	Calangcang	1.2%	521	562	▾	−0.52%
072207009	Candiis	2.4%	1,086	1,019	▴	0.44%
072207011	Dagatan	3.0%	1,351	1,198	▴	0.83%
072207012	Dobdob	2.3%	1,026	1,104	▾	−0.50%
072207013	Ginablan	1.4%	608	584	▴	0.28%
072207014	Lambug	3.3%	1,469	1,405	▴	0.31%
072207015	Malabago	2.1%	954	909	▴	0.33%
072207016	Malhiao	6.6%	2,966	2,886	▴	0.19%
072207017	Manduyong	3.7%	1,668	1,710	▾	−0.17%
072207018	Matutinao	2.0%	904	1,130	▾	−1.53%
072207019	Patong	1.8%	820	823	▾	−0.03%
072207020	Poblacion	9.2%	4,092	4,002	▴	0.15%
072207021	Sanlagan	1.8%	782	910	▾	−1.04%
072207022	Santicon	1.2%	530	524	▴	0.08%
072207023	Sohoton	2.5%	1,125	1,069	▴	0.35%
072207024	Sulsugan	0.9%	417	467	▾	−0.78%
072207025	Talayong	2.0%	909	878	▴	0.24%
072207026	Taytay	4.7%	2,099	2,046	▴	0.18%
072207027	Tigbao	2.0%	874	799	▴	0.62%
072207028	Tiguib	1.1%	487	483	▴	0.06%
072207029	Tubod	2.6%	1,144	1,065	▴	0.50%
072207030	Zaragosa	3.8%	1,702	1,676	▴	0.11%
	Total		44,626	37,699	▴	1.17%

=== Poblacion ===
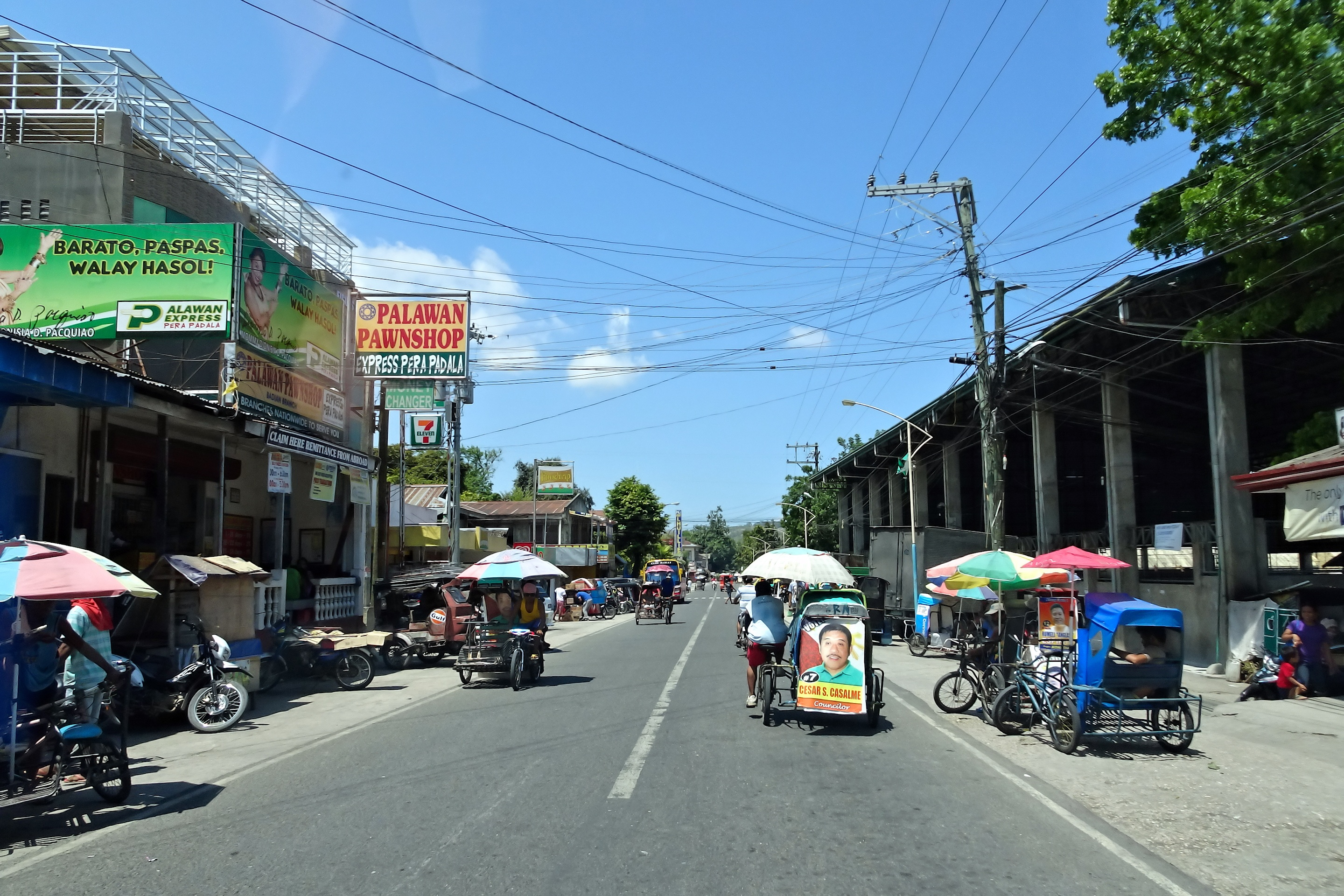
Poblacion

The main barangay of Badian is the Poblacion, located in the center of the town. It is the only urban barangay, and the most populous of Badian. It contains the hospital and the marketplace where most of the trading takes place. Many vendors from all over town trade here particularly at weekends.

Poblacion is where the local high school is located. Badian National High School (BNHS) is one of two high schools in Badian. This is also the larger of the two and many students come from neighboring towns to study here. The lower educational facility in Badian is the Badian Central Elementary School where all the younger children go to school.

Poblacion is also the location of the church of Santiago Apostle, whose feast day is celebrated each 25 July. Held together with the feast of Santiago Apostle is the Banig Festival, the town's flagship festival, celebrating the town's bed making industry.

=== Climate ===
Climate data for Badian, Cebu
Month	Jan	Feb	Mar	Apr	May	Jun	Jul	Aug	Sep	Oct	Nov	Dec	Year
Mean daily maximum °C (°F)	29 (84)	30 (86)	31 (88)	32 (90)	31 (88)	30 (86)	30 (86)	30 (86)	30 (86)	29 (84)	29 (84)	29 (84)	30 (86)
Mean daily minimum °C (°F)	22 (72)	22 (72)	23 (73)	24 (75)	25 (77)	25 (77)	24 (75)	24 (75)	24 (75)	24 (75)	24 (75)	23 (73)	24 (75)
Average precipitation mm (inches)	42 (1.7)	34 (1.3)	40 (1.6)	61 (2.4)	124 (4.9)	188 (7.4)	190 (7.5)	191 (7.5)	189 (7.4)	186 (7.3)	124 (4.9)	73 (2.9)	1,442 (56.8)
Average rainy days	10.0	8.5	9.5	12.8	22.3	26.8	28.4	27.9	27.3	27.6	20.5	13.1	234.7
Source: Meteoblue (Use with caution: this is modeled/calculated data, not measured locally.)

== Demographics ==
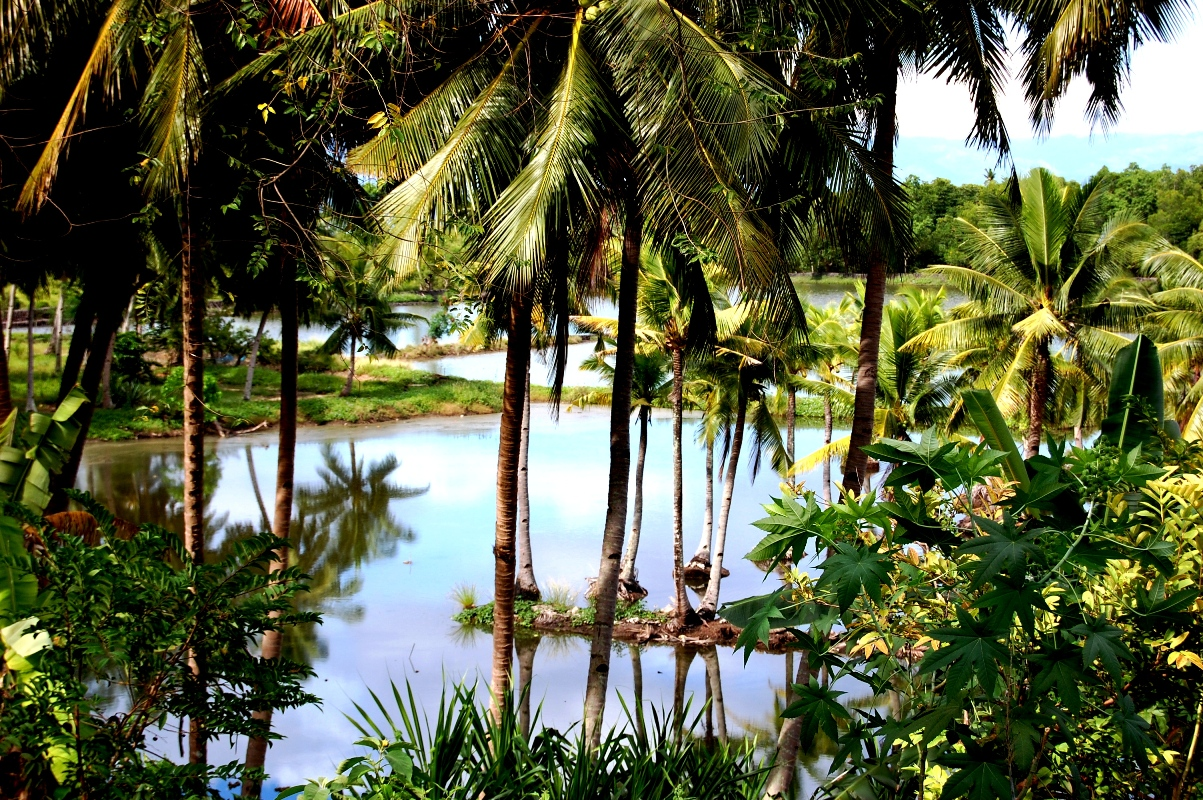
Fish ponds in Badian

Population census of Badian
Year	Pop.	±% p.a.
1903	10,935	—
1918	17,239	+3.08%
1939	17,817	+0.16%
1948	19,078	+0.76%
1960	18,331	−0.33%
1970	18,514	+0.10%
1975	20,406	+1.97%
1980	21,512	+1.06%
1990	26,545	+2.12%
1995	29,200	+1.80%
2000	30,400	+0.87%
2007	35,876	+2.31%
2010	37,699	+1.82%
2015	37,912	+0.11%
2020	43,735	+3.05%
2024	44,626	+0.49%
Source: Philippine Statistics Authority

== Economy ==
Poverty incidence of Badian (%)

Source: Philippine Statistics Authority

== Tourism ==
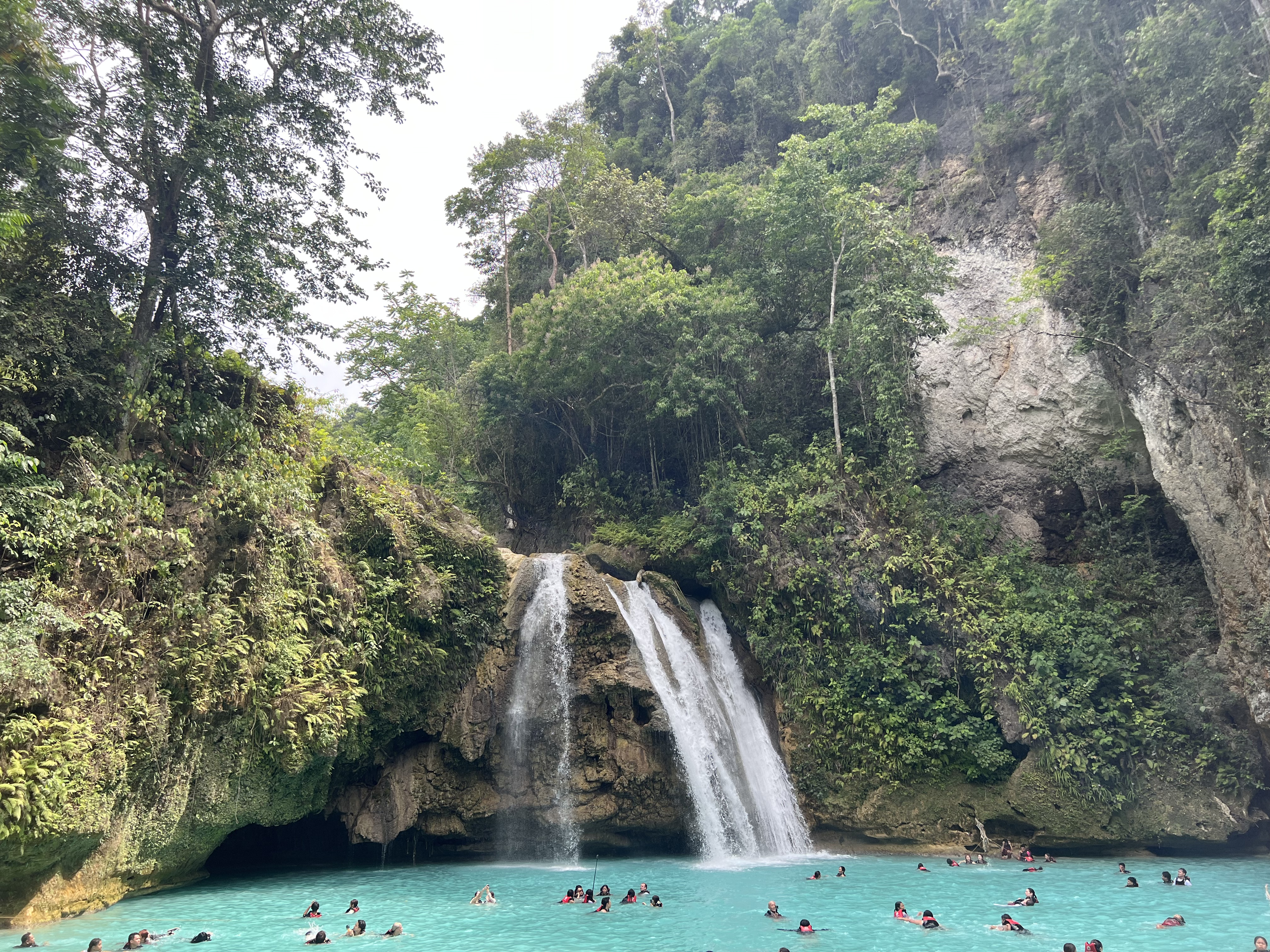
Kawasan Falls

The Kawasan Falls, a three-layered waterfall, is one of the popular tourist destinations in the province, declared as top 6 Most Beautiful Waterfalls in the World by The Botique Adventurer Travel Blog. Canyoneering tours are offered upstream of the Kawasan Falls, where the Matutinao river flows through a secluded canyon, it is also awarded as the Best Adventure Destination of Cebu's Best by Sunstar. There is also the Badian mountain range and the popular trekking destination of Osmeña Peak located in Brgy. Patong along with Kandungaww Peak, located in Brgy. Sohoton.

The town's jurisdiction includes Zaragosa or Badian Island, where there is a white sandy private beach and which from there snorkeling and diving activities can be arranged. Nearby Pescador Island, Moalboal offers corals and marine life for divers.

Other tourist attractions of Badian include:

- Cebu International Golf and Resort in Lambug (the only 18‑hole, par‑72 course golf course in the town)
- the manicured gardens of Terra Manna beach and camping resort
- Grandeur Beach Resort located in Lambug Beach
- crab hunting in the mangroves.
- Toong Spring Nature Park - On April 15, 2024, second placer, Badian, as Central Visayas lone winner, was awarded P20 million by the Department of Tourism's Tourism Champions Challenge, for the development of Toong Spring Nature Park in Barangay Poblacion. The tourist attraction is a biodiversity and nature conservation showcasing a butterfly garden, rock wall, Toong spring and walking paths among others.

The town is also hailed as Cebu's "Banig Capital" due to the town's prime product, the "Banig", a woven mat made from Pandanus. The townsfolk are masters of the craft of Banig weaving as much of their skill and prowess in mat weaving was inherited by from forefathers. Because of the booming local economy in matt weaving, the town initiated a major religious-cultural endeavor that was meant to promote the Banigs of Badian. This endeavor came to be recognized as the "Banig Festival", a religious festival in honor of the town's patron saint, St. James the Great, which was also meant to be a major tourism endeavor to promote the mat and the town. The dancers in the participating festival contingents put on stylized and intricately cut and woven costumes made from Banig.

== Education ==
The public schools in the town of Badian are administered by one school district under the Schools Division of Cebu Province.

Elementary schools:

- Alawijao Primary School — Alawijao
- Badian Central Elementary School — Poblacion
- Banhigan Elementary School — Banhigan
- Basak Elementary School — Basak
- Basangpangpang Elementary School — Sitio Basangpangpang, Candiis
- Basiao Elementary School — Basiao
- Bato Elementary School — Bato
- Bugas Elementary School — Bugas
- Calangcang Elementary School — Calangcang
- Candiis Elementary School — Candiis
- Dagatan Elementary School — Dagatan
- Lambug Elementary School — Lambug
- Malabago Elementary School — Malabago
- Malhiao Elementary School — Malhiao
- Manduyong Elementary School — Manduyong
- Matutinao Elementary School — Matutinao
- Patong Elementary School — Patong
- Sanlagan Elementary School — Sanlagan
- Santicon Elementary School — Santicon
- Sohoton Elementary School — Sohoton
- Talayong Elementary School — Talayong
- Taytay Elementary School — Taytay
- Tigbao Elementary School — Tigbao
- Tubod Elementary School — Tubod

High schools:

- Badian National High School — Poblacion
- Manduyong National High School — Manduyong
- Sanlagan National High School (formerly Badian NHS - Sanlagan Extension) — Sanlagan
- Tubod National High School — Tubod

Integrated schools:

- Zaragosa Integrated School — Zaragosa

Private schools:

- Saint James Academy — Poblacion

== Sources ==
- Cabigas, Estan (10 November 2009), "Man-made structures mar Kawasan Falls" (Photographic essay), Langyaw, archived from the original on 23 November 2009
