= Volley (shoe) =

Brand of athletic shoes

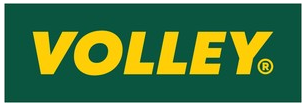
- Founded: 1939; 87 years ago
- Headquarters: Australia
- Area served: Worldwide
- Parent: Brand Collective
- Website: volley.com.au

Volley, formerly known as Dunlop Volley, is an Australian brand of athletic shoes manufactured by Brand Collective.

For many years, it was produced by Dunlop Sport (Australia), a sports equipment subsidiary of Pacific Brands. It separated the Volley brand into its Brand Collective, which was sold to Anchorage Capital Partners, a private equity firm, in November 2014.

The shoe is constructed of cotton canvas with a thermoplastic rubber sole. It was introduced by Dunlop Australia in 1939, and has had only minor changes to its design since then. Originally plain white in colour with a vulcanised rubber sole, it evolved into the iconic green and gold stripe along the ankle and heel with a direct injection sole in the 1970s. Today, the standard design is white with a 3-stripe woven tape on the heel, although the green and gold stripe, and an all-black version, are also available.

== History ==
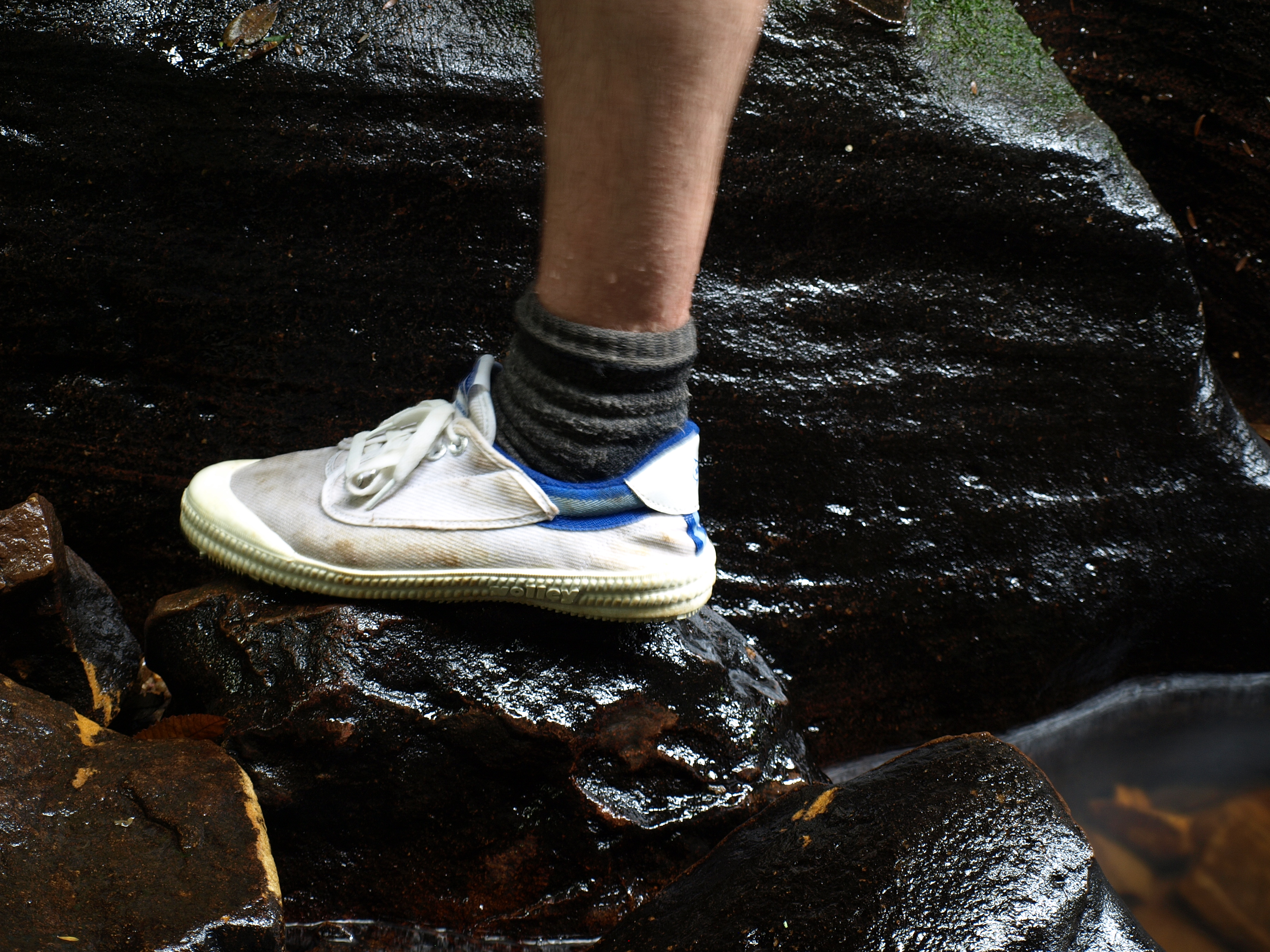
Dunlop Volley Canyoning

The Volley was originally developed in 1939 as a tennis shoe by Adrian Quist, a famous Australian tennis player and employee of Dunlop. Quist borrowed a pair of boat shoes, with herringbone pattern sole, during his Davis Cup tournament win in the US and, upon his return, convinced Dunlop to develop it as a high-grip sports shoe. The original shoe was called the Volley OC (Orthopaedically Correct) and was later worn by Rod Laver, Margaret Court, Evonne Goolagong Cawley, Ken Rosewall, among others.

In that same year, the Volley OC was released. In the 1970s, Dunlop released a new style of Volley named the Volley International. The new model featured a revised style of upper and a direct-injection thermoplastic sole. From 1978 to 1985, there was a large volume of sales of the Volley in Australia. It became virtually the standard tennis shoe, and was also popular with roofers, who needed a sure foothold on sloping roof surfaces, wood choppers, painters and hikers. In 1976, Mark Edmondson won the Australian Open, wearing Dunlop Volleys, putting them back into the spotlight.

During the early 1980s, Dunlop briefly sold a "basketball boot" version of the Volley International, which covered the ankle. Those shoes, which had the high-grip herringbone tread, were highly prized by rafters and bushwalkers, who appreciated the lighter weight compared with hiking boots, the dissipation of the friction point at the heel, the reduced entry of sand and debris, and the protection to the ankles against knocks from rocks when wading in rapids. The cotton canvas around the ankle was a seamless extension of the Volley's uppers. It did not seek to support the ankle, only protect it. However, by 1983, the boot was unavailable.

Dunlop Volleys were standard issue by the Australian Army and Royal Australian Air Force until the late 1980s, and are still issued by the Royal Australian Navy, although sometimes the Spalding imitation shoe is substituted.

A worn Dunlop Volley

In 1998, Dunlop Footwear moved production offshore and, in 2004, Dunlop Sport became part of the Pacific Brands group. By 2009, the Dunlop volley brand was diluted with a vast array of casual slip on shoes, and plagued with production quality problems and constant supplier changes.

In 2011, Dunlop created Volley as a stand-alone brand, reverting the "Volley International" to its 1970s design, and brought the original OC and SS shoes back into the product range. By 2012, Volley had released the "High Leap" variation of the International.

From 2014 to 2017, Volley released some new styles which included the "Grass-Court", launched in collaboration with the Tony Bianco footwear brand, and helped Volley elevate the brand, with the Volleys retailing at over AUD100. Those styles harked back to some of the iconic tennis silhouettes of older Dunlop brands.

The Dunlop Volley was part of the official uniform of the Australian Olympic team at the 2020 Tokyo Olympics.

Dunlop Volleys have been the shoe of choice for Australian canyoners since the inception of the sport, due their grip on wet, slippery rocks.
