= KingGee =

Australian work clothing brand

- Industry: Workwear
- Founded: 1926; 100 years ago
- Headquarters: Sydney, Australia
- Products: Shoes, apparel,
- Owner: Workwear Group
- Website: www.kinggee.com

KingGee (formerly known as King Gee) is an Australian work wear brand. The name is said to have originated from the reigning monarch at the time, King George V, and was an expression that meant 'tops' or 'the best'. The company was established in Sydney in 1926 by Robert Adcock, and initially produced overalls, but has since grown its products to supply a large range of work wear (including under the "Workcool" and "Tradies" ranges), footwear and accessories.

== History ==
In March 1926, a trade mark application for King Gee was successfully made by Robert Adcock of Concord in Sydney. The trademark was to cover "articles of clothing, including overalls".

After its inception, the brand grew strongly, and supplied uniforms for the defence services during World War II. After his father's retirement, Warren David Adcock OBE, took control of the company. Adcock, became amongst other things, a board member of Bradmill Textiles, a company also founded in Sydney in the 1920s.

in 2001, Pacific Brands acquired KingGee from Sara Lee. In the final six months of 2008, Pacific Brands posted a net loss of $150 million. Following that, in February 2009, 74 workers were retrenched at the Bellambi factory in New South Wales. Citing difficult economic conditions, all manufacturing was moved overseas. As part of Pacific Brands Workwear Group, the KingGee brand was bought by Wesfarmers in 2014.

== See also ==
- Steel Blue
