= River trekking =

Outdoor activities along a river

River tracing, also known as stream climbing or river trekking, is a form of mountaineering that involves going up mountain streams to their source performed for sport and outdoor recreation. The activity is popular in Japan, where it is known as sawanobori, and is also popular in Hong Kong and Taiwan.

River tracing usually involves a combination of hiking, climbing, and swimming to ascend stream and its features, including climbing waterfalls, traversing ravine walls, and swimming through gorges. As a rule, the climber moves in the direction opposite the direction of the waterflow. Climbing advanced routes requires being proficient in techniques derived from rock climbing and mountaineering, including belaying, rappelling, and lead climbing. Due to the additional dangers presented by having to navigate the watercourse, additional useful skills include experience in whitewater techniques, an understanding the geographical and meteorological properties of river and valleys, being capable of dealing with sudden bad weather and finding possible exits from the river.

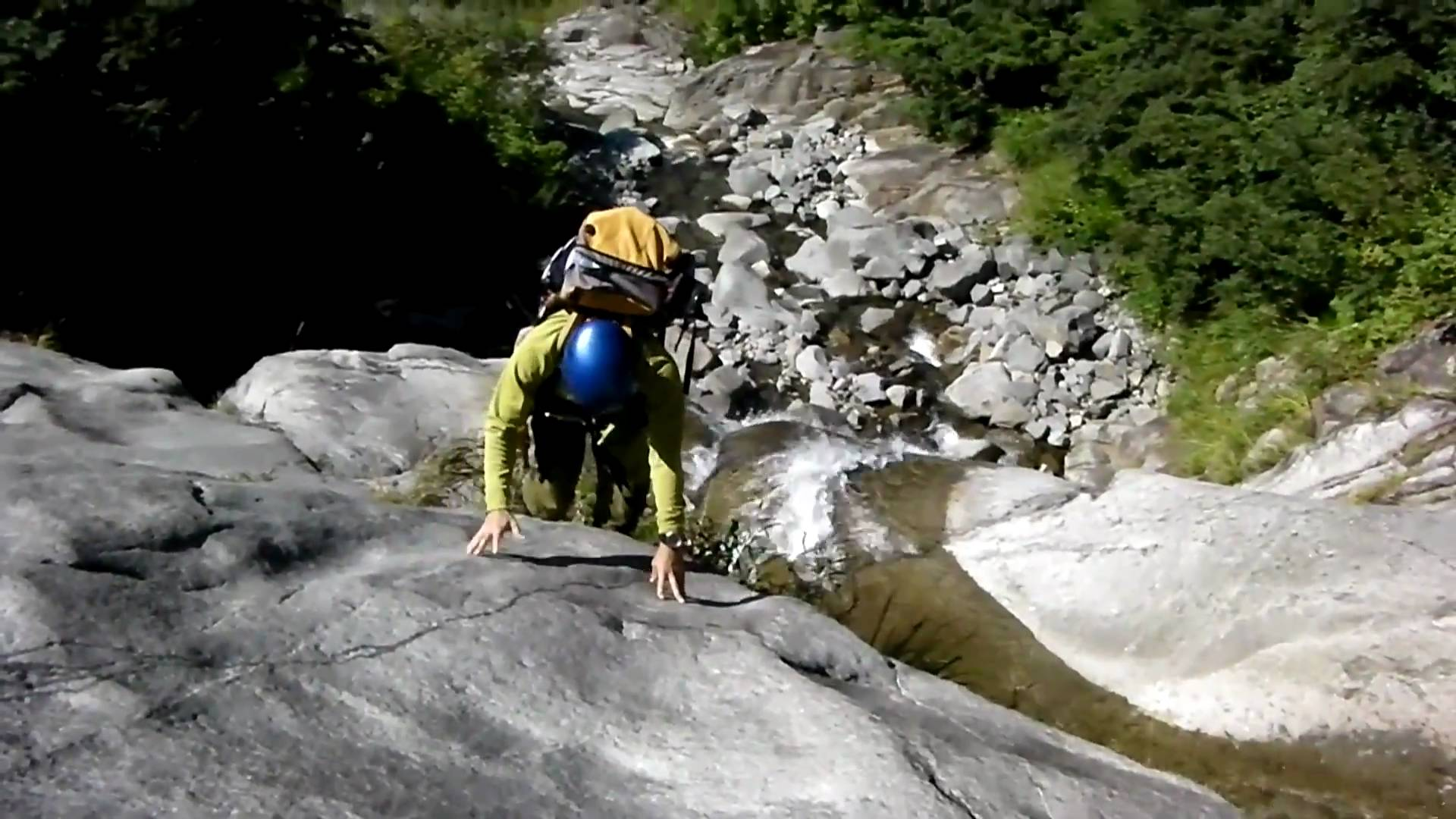
Sawanobori in Niigata, Japan

== Similarity to canyoning ==
In the sense that the activity takes place in a steep watercourse, the activity is similar to canyoning or canyoneering. However, the fundamental difference is the direction of movement: canyoneers move downstream with the flow of water while river tracers move upstream against the flow of water.

== River trekking around the world ==
Both Japan and Taiwan have developed industries that support the activity with the production of special equipment, and standardized commercial tours. In Japan, the mountaineering equipment company Finetrack was founded in 2007 by engineers from Montbell with the goal of providing specialized equipment for river tracing expeditions. In Taiwan, Shawa Canyoning, a river tracing tour provider has since created the TEBYLON brand, innovating in both the river tracing and canyoning equipment markets.

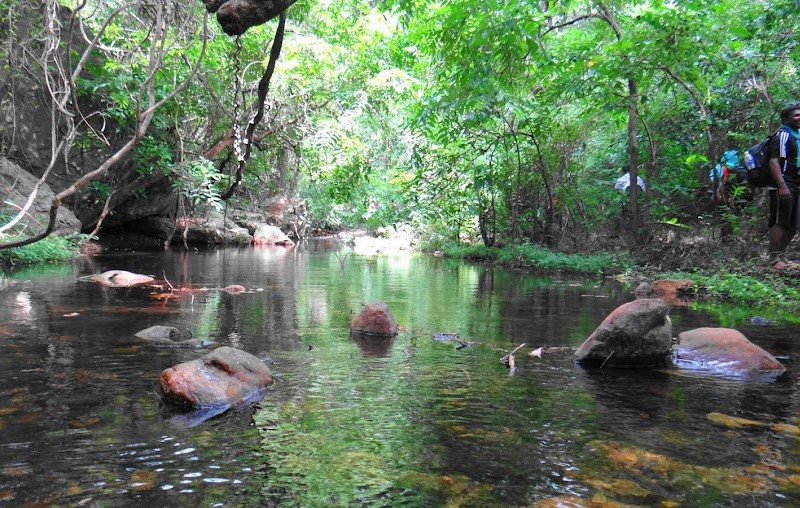
Stream trekking in Nagalapuram, India

=== Japan ===
Japan and Taiwan are the most popular destinations for this sport. In Japan it is called stream climbing (沢登り, sawanobori). People used to climb with waraji, but felt-bottomed shoes are standard now.

=== Taiwan ===
This sport is popular throughout Taiwan, where it is generally called river tracing (溯溪). Due to the island's mountainous nature, the activity can be performed all around the island. In particular Pingtung County, Kaohsiung City, Hualien County and Yilan County are well known as offering a diverse selection of river tracing destinations and tour providers.

Routes vary in length from half-day and full-day sections of river, which are suitable for commercial tours, to multi-day sections of creek. Tours provide necessary safety equipment which include felt-bottomed waders, PFDs, and climbing helmets.

=== Hong Kong ===
==== Nine Big Rivers ====
The Nine Big Rivers (九大石澗) are the nine streams that are most popular among river trekkers in Hong Kong. The Nine Big Rivers include:

| Romanization | Hanzi | Location |
|---|---|---|
| Tai Shing River | 大城石澗 | in Tsuen Wan District |
| Wan Chung Stream | 橫涌石澗 | in Tai Po District |
| Ng Tung Stream | 梧桐石澗 | in Tai Po/Lam Tsuen |
| Wong Lung River | 黃龍石澗 | on Lantau Island near Tung Chung |
| Sheng Luk River | 雙鹿石澗 | in Sai Kung District |
| Shui Lo Cho/Man Cheng Po | 水澇漕石澗/萬丈布石澗 | in the west of Lantau Island |
| Lotus Stream | 蓮花石澗 | in Tai Lam Country Park |
| Ngon Sam Stream | 昂深石澗 | on Lantau Island near Great Buddha |
| Ping Nam River | 屏南石澗 | close to the border between Hong Kong and mainland China |

=== Philippines ===
In the Philippines, river trekking is just gaining its popularity especially with the introduction of Mapawa Nature Park in Cagayan de Oro in Mindanao. There are five challenges in the river which includes swimming, rappelling, jumping and sliding among others.

The particular nature park was featured on GMA 7's now defunct reality show Extra Challenge.

=== South Africa ===
The South African version of river trekking is called kloofing and has gained a similar following from both an informal recreational and commercial point of view.

== Rating of difficulties ==
As river trekking has a certain level of risk, experienced river trekkers or hiking groups have developed rating systems about difficulties on different rivers. The ratings usually are various from 1 to 5 stars, even though a few rivers can be more than five stars because of their extreme difficulties. Such ratings are largely subjective, depending largely on river trekker's own experience. Therefore, different people or hiking groups would give different number of stars on the same river. According to Hong Kong Adventurer, an English Website about hiking and river trekking in Hong Kong, difficult scale of different rivers as:

| Number of stars | Description |
|---|---|
| 1 | can be handled by normal healthy persons |
| 2 | not too easy |
| 3 | fairly difficult |
| 4 | difficult, absolutely not for beginners |
| 5 | very difficult, very demanding in term of strength and skill |

== Risks and dangers ==
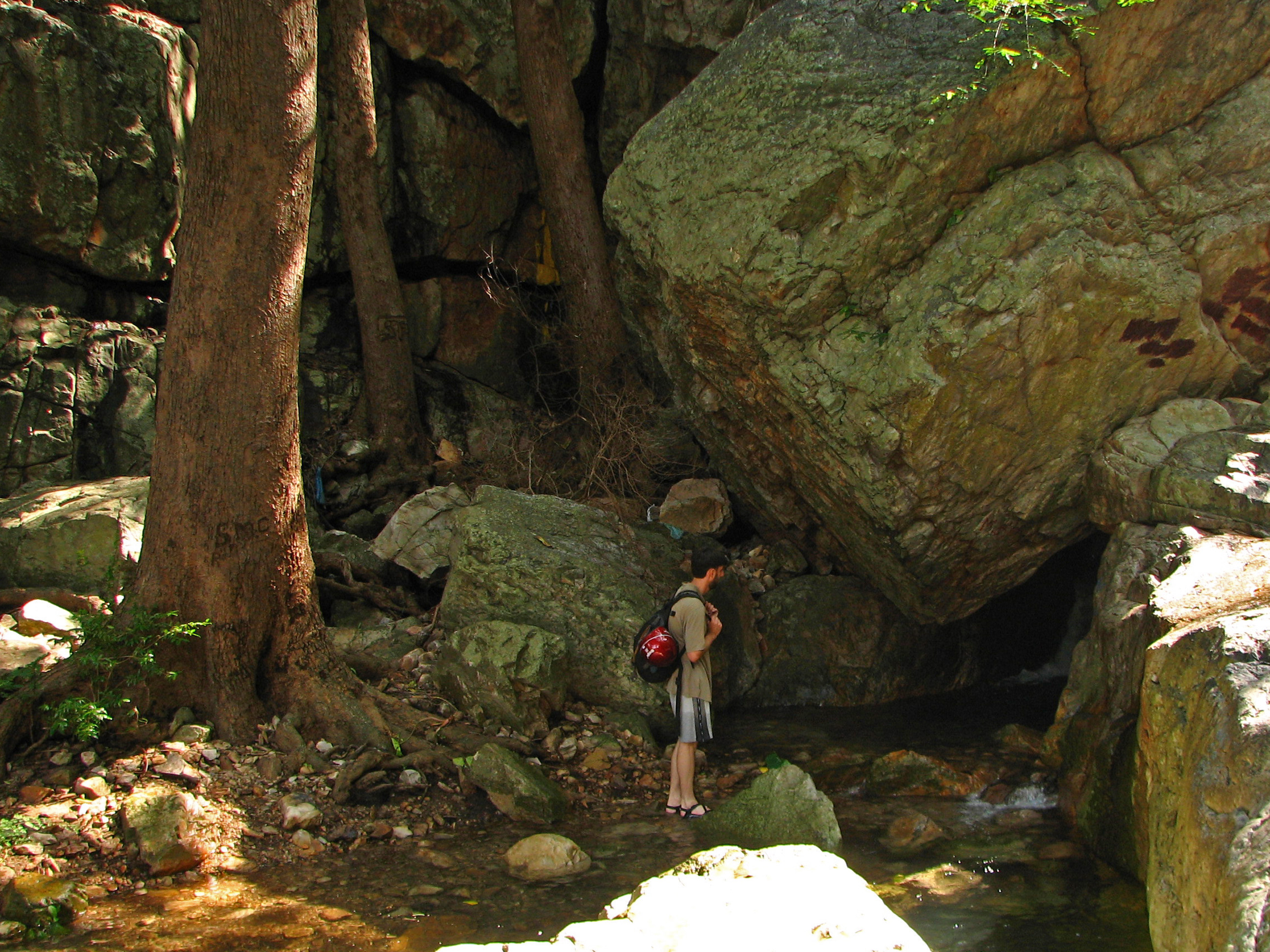
Trekking to Tada Falls

River trekking has a certain level of risk. There are occasional accidents in river trekking, including falls from steep cliffs or waterfalls, drownings, exhaustion, or getting lost. Risks that should be prepared for include the following:

Flash flooding poses a serious danger. Sudden changes in weather, like rainstorms, can cause rapid rises in the level and speed of the river water. Also, the number of viable paths and climbing areas inside the river valley could be reduced suddenly in a very short period.

Visibility can be limited by rainy or misty weather. Low visibility may come in too quickly for trekkers to adapt to. Therefore, a torch (flashlight), preferably a head-mounted one, is a must for river trekking.

Steep cliffs inside river valleys require a certain level of rock-climbing skills. However, because of the humid environment inside river valleys, some rock surfaces can be wet and some rocks may be loose despite appearing solid. To deal with wet climbing conditions, professional river-trekking boots are strongly advised.

== See also ==
- Canyoning
- Hiking
- Kloofing
- Geography of Hong Kong
- Country parks and conservation in Hong Kong
- Environment of Hong Kong
