= Dunlop Sport (Australia) =

Local subsidiary

- Type: Subsidiary
- Industry: Sports equipment, footwear
- Founded: 1924
- Defunct: 2016; 10 years ago
- Fate: Acquired by Sports Direct, later sold to SRI Sports
- Headquarters: Melbourne, Australia
- Area served: Australia
- Products: Tennis and squash racquets, tennis balls, squash balls, golf clubs, golf balls, sneakers
- Parent: SRI Sports
- Divisions: Dunlop Footwear

Dunlop Sport (Australia) was the local subsidiary of the international sports equipment company Dunlop Sport. Focused on the tennis and golf markets, Dunlop Australia products included tennis and squash racquets, tennis balls, squash balls, golf clubs and golf balls.

The company also manufactured athletic shoes through the "Dunlop Footwear" division. Some of its most renowned shoes were the Volley and the KT-26.

== History ==
In 1924, the Dunlop Rubber Company of Australasia started making sandshoes in its factories in Melbourne, to complement their gum boots that the company had been producing since 1915. By 1932, Dunlop was manufacturing 2 million pairs a year. In 1939 the company introduced the Volley shoes, designed by tennis player Adrian Quist, who convinced Dunlop to make tennis shoe with the same sole pattern he had seen while touring on North America. Players who wore the Volley included Ken Rosewall, Lew Hoad, Frank Sedgman, Neal Fraser, John Bromwich, Evonne Goolagong-Cawley, Margaret Court, among others.

By 1957 Dunlop footwear employed over 1,000 people. In 1965, Dunlop Rubber Co. established "Dunlop Footwear", a division to specifically design and manufacture shoes.

Dunlop Australia acquired many other shoe businesses, including some in the US. As a result, the company introduced the KT-26 running shoe, which originated as the Osaga KT-26 in the US and was then sold mainly in Australia and Papua New Guinea.

In 2004, Dunlop Sports Australia became a division of Pacific Brands.

In November 2014, Pacific Brands sold its Dunlop Sport (Australia) and Slazenger brands to International Brand Management & Licensing (IBML), a division of Sports Direct International, a PLC of the United Kingdom, which had already operated the Dunlop and Slazenger brands in every other market except Australia and New Zealand since 2004. Pacific Brands moved its Volley and other shoe brands to its subsidiary, Brand Collective Pty Ltd, which was sold to private equity firm Anchorage Capital Partners in November 2014.

In 2016, Sports Direct International sold Dunlop Sport International including Dunlop Sport (Australia) as now part of Japanese Sumitomo's division of SRI Sports.
