= Canyoning =

Traveling in canyons using a variety of techniques

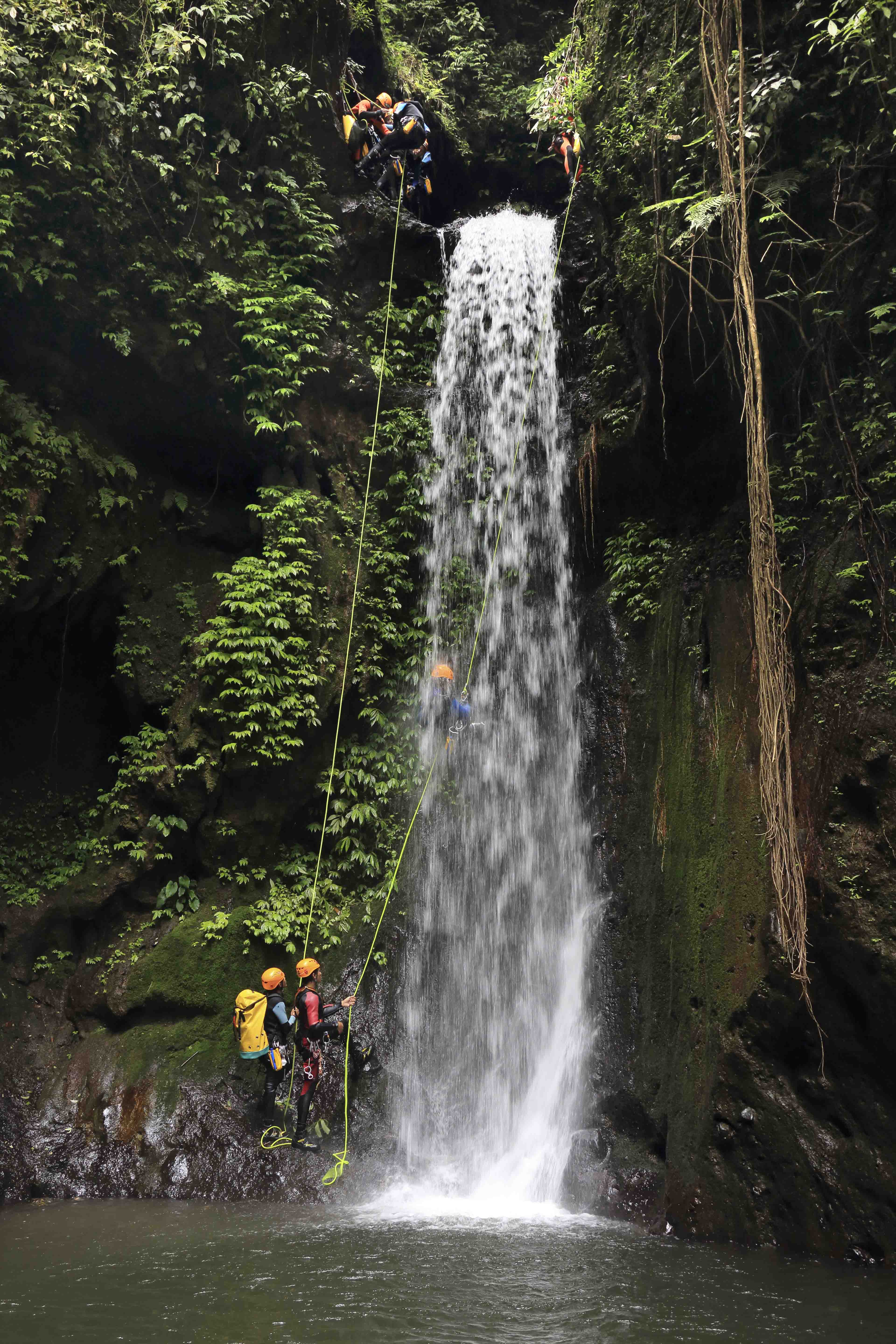
Canyoning in Gitgit, Bali, Indonesia

Canyoning (canyoneering in the United States, kloofing in South Africa) is a sport that involves traveling through canyons using a variety of techniques, such as walking, scrambling, climbing, jumping, abseiling (rappelling), swimming, and rafting.

Although non-technical descents such as hiking down a canyon ("canyon hiking") are often referred to as "canyoneering", the terms "canyoning" and "canyoneering" are more often associated with technical descents—those that require rappels and ropework, technical climbing or down-climbing, technical jumps, and/or technical swims.

Canyoning is frequently done in remote and rugged settings and often requires navigational, route-finding, and other wilderness travel skills.

Canyons that are ideal for canyoning are often cut into the bedrock stone, forming narrow gorges with numerous drops, sculpted walls, and sometimes waterfalls. Most canyons are cut into limestone, sandstone, granite, or basalt, though other rock types are found. Canyons can be very easy or extremely difficult, though emphasis in the sport is usually on aesthetics and fun rather than pure difficulty. A wide variety of canyoning routes are found throughout the world.

Canyoning gear includes climbing hardware, semi-static ropes, helmets, wetsuits, and specially designed shoes, packs, and rope bags. While canyoneers have used and adapted climbing, hiking, and river running gear for years, more and more specialized gear has been developed as the as sport's popularity increases.

== Canyoning around the world ==
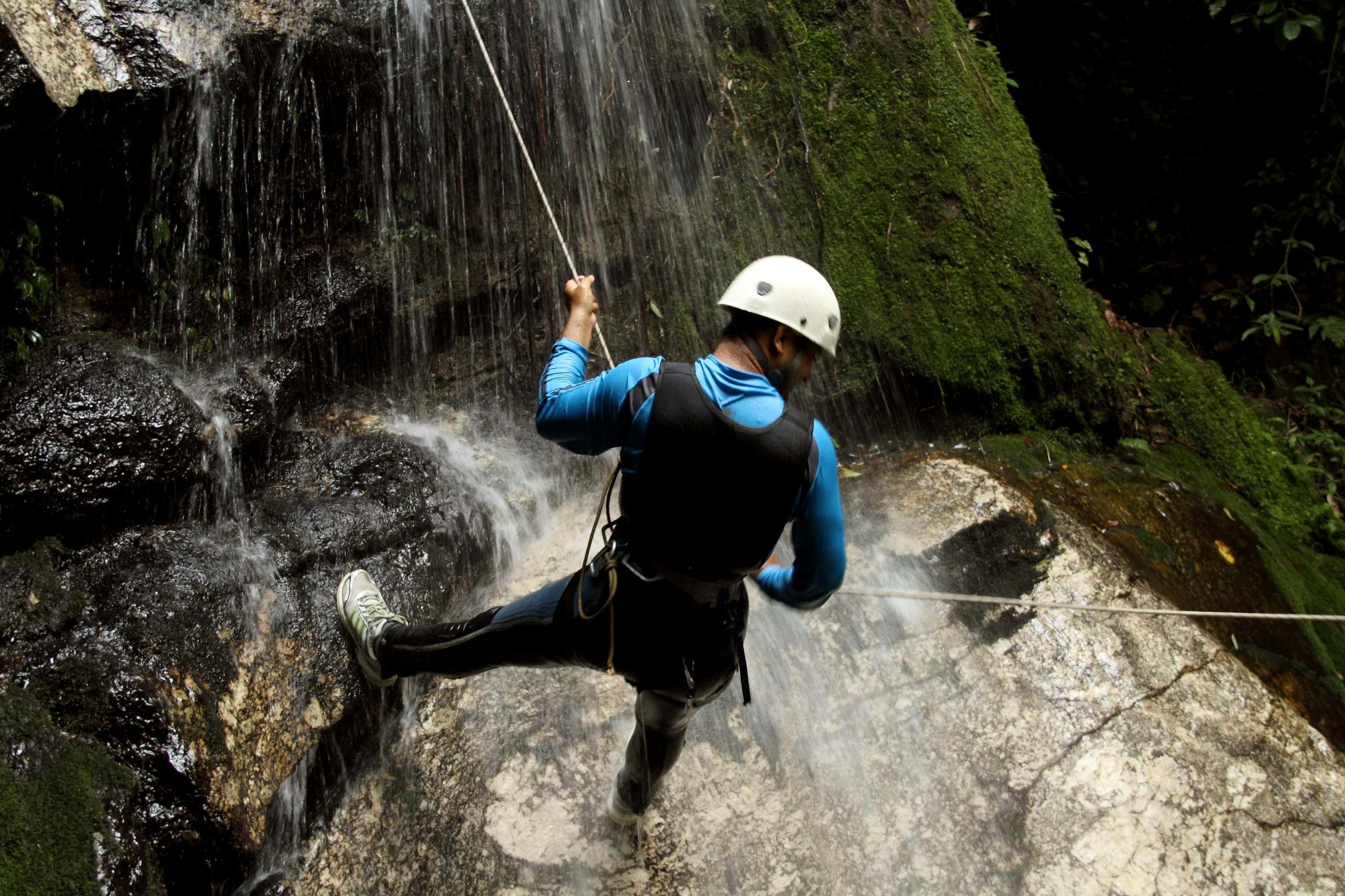
Canyoning in Sundarijal, Kathmandu, Nepal

In most parts of the world, canyoning is done in mountain canyons with flowing water. The number of countries with established canyoning outfitters is growing yearly.

=== Asia ===
Nepal has huge potential for adventurous travellers with activities such as mountaineering, trekking, canyoning, rafting, paragliding, mountain biking, and honey hunting. Canyoning is prominent in Sundarijal (Kathmandu), Sindhupalchowk (Old jambo), Pokhara, Jalabire (Chitwan) among others. Dalat in Vietnam is well known for canyoning and rapelling. In Japan, "kyanioningu" and sawanobori are practised, the latter being the sport of climbing up canyons and gorges. In Taiwan, canyoning is practiced alongside a sport called river tracing that typically involves travelling upstream. The Philippines has a canyoneering run at Kawasan Falls, Badian, Cebu that is popular among foreign travellers.

=== Europe ===
Canyoning in the United Kingdom has gained in popularity over recent years. In the UK, Wales, Scotland, Cumbria and Yorkshire and some areas of Cornwall are recognized as the prime locations for this activity. In the Welsh language, canyoning is called cerdded ceunant ("gorge walking"). It is also referred to as "gorge walking" or "ghyllscrambling" which the UK Scout Association defines as "the activity of following a river bed through a gorge. This often includes climbing, swimming, abseiling and scrambling depending upon the environment".

Ticino, Switzerland, is a popular canyoning destination because of its granite rock, crystal green pools and its pleasant Mediterranean climate. Some nice and popular canyoning spots can also be found in Slovenia, Italy and Austria. Spain has also emerged as a popular canyoning spot, owing to its warm climate and abundance of rock formations conducive to canyoning. Portugal also has canyoning in the Azores and Madeira.

=== North America ===
In the United States, descending mountain canyons with flowing water is sometimes referred to as canyoning, although the term "canyoneering" is more common. Most canyoneering in the United States occurs in the many slot canyons carved in the sandstone found throughout the Colorado Plateau. Outside of the Colorado Plateau, numerous canyoneering opportunities are found throughout Arizona, California, Colorado, Utah, and the Pacific Northwest. Canyons can be found in the San Gabriel, Sierra Nevada, Cascade, and Rocky Mountain ranges.

In Arizona, there are hundreds of canyons found inside Grand Canyon. Several mountain ranges and wilderness areas such as the Sierra Anchas, Mazatzal Mountains, Santa Catalina, West Fork of Oak Creek, and West Clear Creek Wilderness also have many technical canyons.

=== Oceania ===
Canyoning is common in Australia in the many sandstone slot canyons of the Blue Mountains National Park, known for their technical abseil starts and lack of fast flowing water.

=== Africa ===
In South Africa, the term "Kloofing" is used, which is derived from the Afrikaans word 'kloof', meaning 'gorge' or 'ravine'. It has been adopted by English-speaking people (mostly in southern Africa), to mean the activity described above. The word is used in a similar sense to canyoning and canyoneering. The word (and activity) has been in use in South Africa since about the 1920s and probably earlier.

== Hazards ==
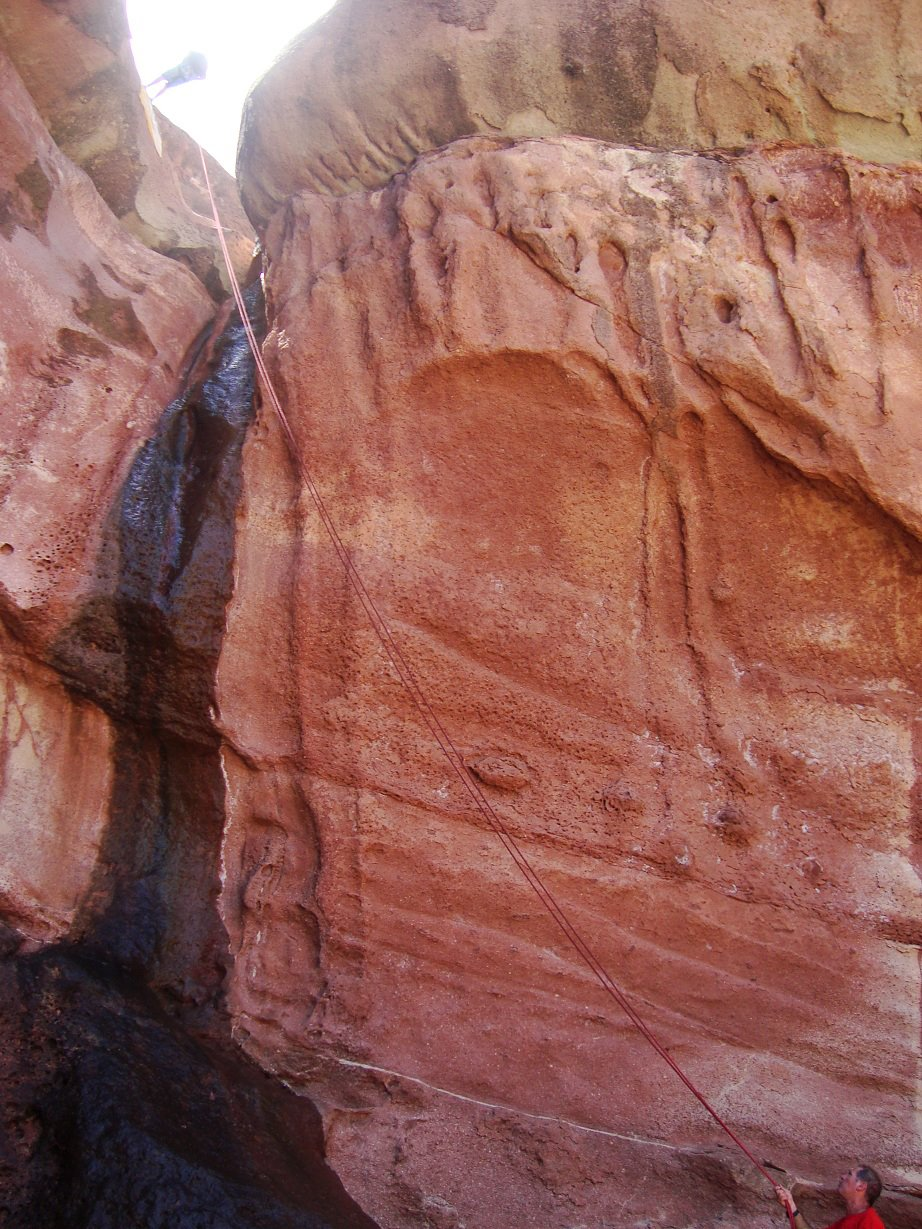
Canyoning via rappel in the Atuel Canyon, San Rafael, Mendoza, Argentina

Canyoning can be dangerous. Escape via the sides of a canyon is often impossible, and completion of the descent is the only possibility. Due to the remoteness and inaccessibility of many canyons, rescue can be impossible for several hours or several days.

=== High water flow / hydraulics ===
Canyons with significant water flow may be treacherous and require special ropework techniques for safe travel. Hydraulics, undercurrents, and sieves (or strainers) occur in flowing canyons and can trap or pin and drown a canyoneer. A 1993 accident in Zion National Park, Utah, US, in which two leaders of a youth group drowned in powerful canyon hydraulics (and the lawsuit which followed) brought notoriety to the sport.

=== Flash floods ===
A potential danger of many canyoning trips is a flash flood. A canyon "flashes" when a large amount of precipitation falls in the drainage, and water levels in the canyon rise quickly as the runoff rushes down the canyon. In canyons that drain large areas, the rainfall could be many kilometers away from the canyoners, completely unbeknown to them. A calm or even dry canyon can quickly become a violent torrent due to a severe thunderstorm in the vicinity. Fatalities have occurred as a result of flash floods; in one widely publicized 1999 incident, 21 tourists on a commercial canyoning adventure trip drowned in Saxetenbach Gorge, Switzerland. Authorities in Switzerland have set in the last few years high standards on safety, "Safety in adventures" label is becoming the standard for all companies to prove they are following the standard safety procedures. Some hidden dangers related to flashflood triggering factors needs to be considered, as the hydrophobicity after wildfires. A case study in Spain (Jerte River) shows how after a wildfire, even during low precipitation events, a flash flood can be generated, increasing peak flow of hydrograph from 2 to 12 m^{3}/s (70 to 420 cu ft/s) with dramatic consequences affecting a guided group of canyoneers and resulting in four deaths.

=== Hypothermia and hyperthermia ===
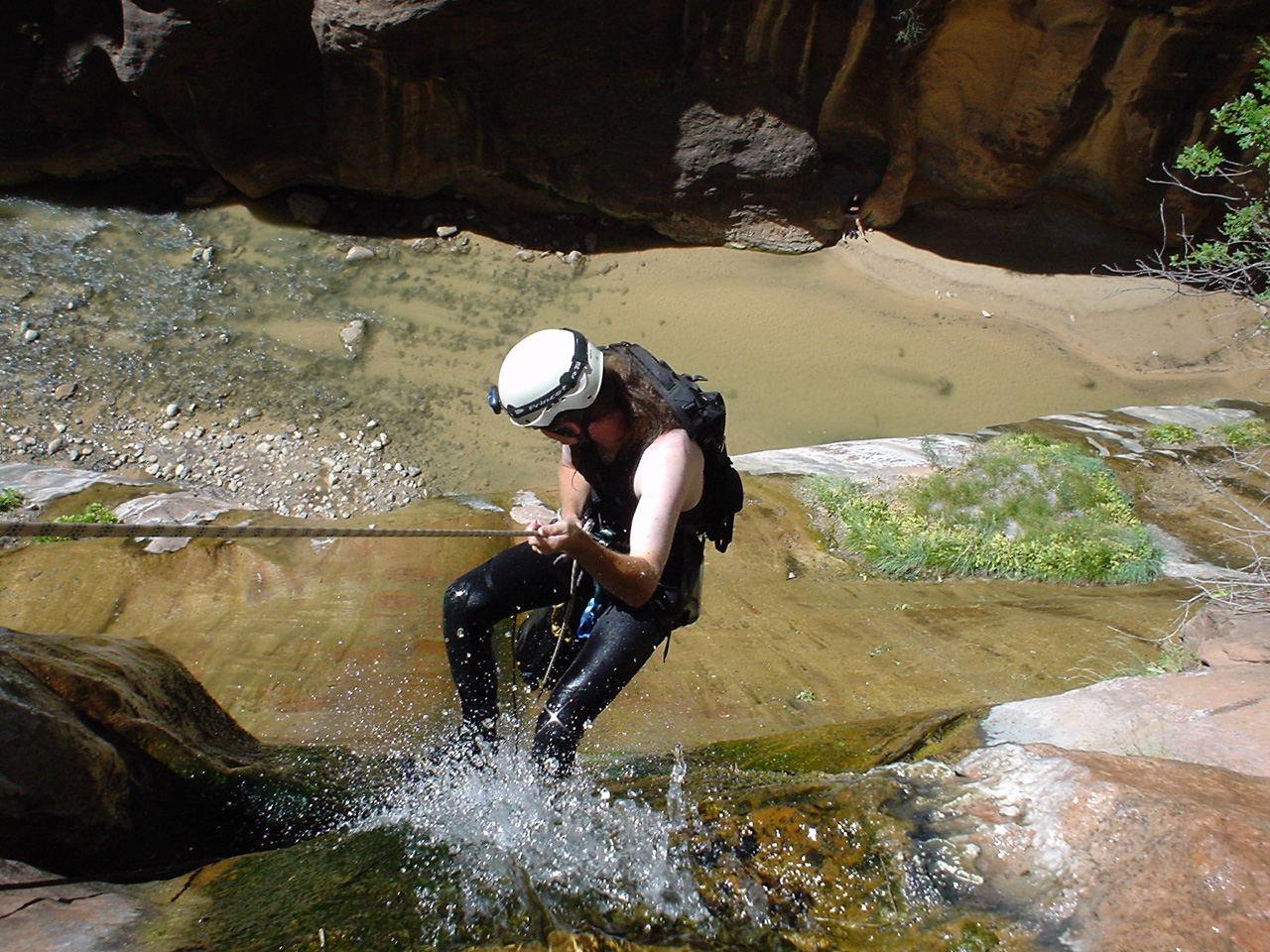
Mystery Canyon, Zion National Park

Temperature-related illnesses are also canyoning hazards. In arid desert canyons, heat exhaustion can occur if proper hydration levels are not maintained and adequate steps are not taken to avoid the intense rays of the sun. Hypothermia can be a serious danger in any canyon that contains water, during any time of the year. Wetsuits and drysuits can mitigate this danger to a large degree, but when people miscalculate the amount of water protection they will need, dangerous and sometimes fatal situations can occur. Hypothermia due to inadequate cold water protection is cited as a cause of a 2005 incident in which two college students drowned in a remote Utah canyon.

=== Keeper potholes ===
Canyoning via packraft in the U.S. southwest deserts.

Some canyoneering, especially in sandstone slots, involves escaping from large potholes. Also called "keeper potholes," these features, carved out by falling water at the bottom of a drop in the watercourse, are circular pits that often contain water that is too deep to stand up in and whose walls are too smooth to easily climb out of. Canyoneers use several unique and creative devices to escape potholes, including hooks used for aid climbing attached to long poles and specialized weighted bags that are attached to ropes and tossed over the lip of a pothole.

=== Very narrow slots ===
Narrow slot canyons, especially those narrower than humans, present difficult obstacles for canyoners. At times a canyoner is forced to climb up (using chimneying or off-width climbing techniques) to a height where one can comfortably manoeuvre laterally with pressure on both walls of the canyon. This tends to be strenuous and can require climbing high above the canyon floor, unprotected, for long periods of time. Failure to complete the required moves could result in being trapped in a canyon where rescue is extremely difficult. Past rescues have required extensive rigging systems and dish soap to extract stuck canyoners.

Narrow sandstone slot canyons tend to have abrasive walls which rip clothing and gear, and can cause painful skin abrasion as a canyoner moves or slides along them.

=== Exposure to water-borne diseases ===
Immersion in water may lead to exposure to diseases such as Weil's Disease (Leptospirosis), dermatitis and gastroenteritis. Ingestion of water should be avoided and taking a shower immediately after canyoning or gorge walking is recommended.

=== Rockfall ===
Canyons are changing environments and falling rocks, including chockstones, are not uncommon. A moving chockstone caused Aron Ralston's 2003 accident where he was forced to amputate his forearm.

=== Becoming lost ===
Many canyons are located in remote areas with limited or sparse trails, and due to their harsh environments, straying from established areas can be dangerous.

== Education and training ==
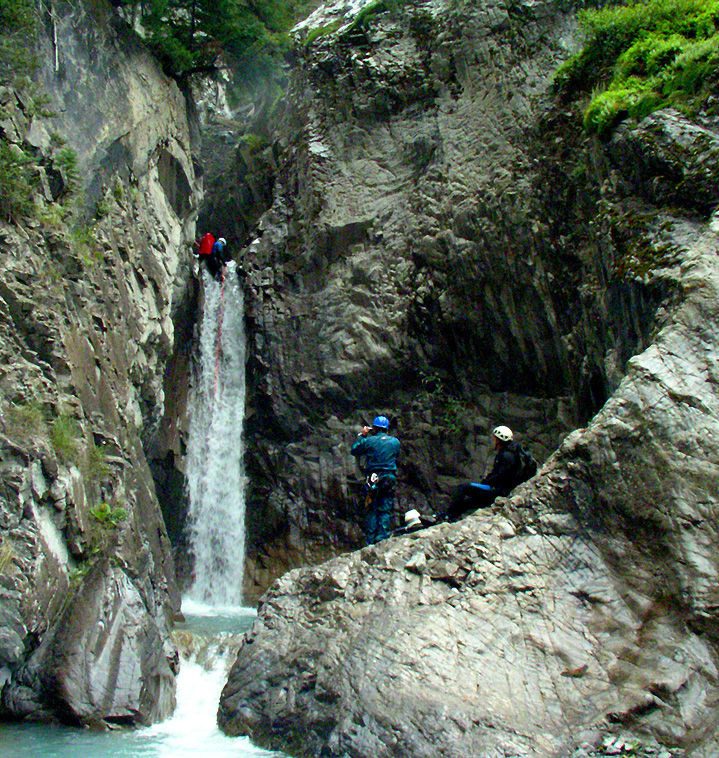
Canyoning in the Rocky Mountains

As the sport of canyoneering grows, there are more people desiring to learn the skills required to safely descend canyons. Several large organizations are now offering classes of various forms to the public; some organizations are training organizations that offer certifications, while other commercial operations offer classes in addition to purely recreational guided tours. The latter is particularly popular in tourist destinations around the world, such as Costa Rica, Hawaii, the Philippines, and Utah. Most programs have multiple levels of skill-set classes. The lowest levels usually cover the basics such as rappelling, rope work, navigation, identification of gear and clothing, and rappel setups. The higher levels cover more complex situations such as anchor building and strategies on how to descend various types of canyons. Other higher level and specialty classes typically cover rescue situations, wilderness first aid, and swift water canyons.

For professional canyoning guide training there are a number of organisations spread throughout the world. In Europe the CIC (Commission Internationale de Canyon) was one of the first organisations, (formerly CEC) for professionals to teach over multiple countries. ICO Pro (International Canyoning Organisation for Professionals), ICA (International Academy of Canyoning Association) and the ACA (American Canyoneering Association), CGI (Canyon Guides International) all offer training courses in multiple countries. There are also many certification systems governed by single countries, many which are based on the original CEC methodology.
