= Hanes Australasia =

Australian consumer products company

- Formerly: Pacific Brands
- Type: Subsidiary
- Founded: 1893 (1985 as "Pacific Brands"), listed on ASX and NSX in 2004
- Headquarters: Camberwell, Melbourne, Australia
- Key people: Peter Bush (Chairman); David Bortolussi (CEO & Group General Manager – Underwear Group); David Muscat (CFO); Paul Gould (Group General Manager – Sheridan); Ian Shannon (Group General Manager – Tontine & Dunlop Flooring)
- Revenue: ▲A$789.7 million (2015)
- Operating income: ▼A$64.2 million (2015)
- Owner: Hanesbrands
- Number of employees: 3500
- Subsidiaries: Key brands include Bonds, Sheridan, Berlei, Jockey, Explorer, Tontine and Dunlop Flooring
- Website: hanesaustralasia.com

Hanes Australasia, formerly Pacific Brands, is an Australian consumer products company. It is a business unit of the American company Hanesbrands.

== Brands ==
Hanes Australasia's principal brands are:

- Bonds – underwear, clothing and babywear
- Bras N Things – lingerie, sleepwear and swimwear
- Berlei – bras and other women's underwear
- Sheridan – bedding, towels and homewares

The company previously operated pillow and flooring businesses under brands including Tontine and Dunlop Flooring. HanesBrands agreed to sell those businesses in 2016, following its acquisition of Pacific Brands.

In July 2026, Gildan Activewear entered into an agreement to sell HanesBrands Australia to BBFIT Investments for approximately A$700 million. Completion of the transaction was expected in the second half of 2026, subject to regulatory approval and other closing conditions.

== History ==
The company's origins go back to 1893, when the Dunlop Pneumatic Tyre Company, then based in Dublin and Belfast, Ireland, opened a branch factory in Melbourne. The branch was sold in 1899 and became a separate company, Dunlop Pneumatic Tyre Company of Australasia Ltd, independent of the original Dunlop company. After several name changes, the Australian company became Pacific Dunlop.

Pacific Brands logo

Pacific Brands was formed as a division of the Australian company Pacific Dunlop in 1985. In 2001, Pacific Dunlop sold the division to CVC Asia Pacific and Catalyst Investment Managers, who in 2004 floated the company on the Australian Stock Exchange. The company's stock forms part of the ASX 200 index.

On 28 June 2016, the company suspended trading on the ASX in order to be acquired by Hanesbrands. Corporate changes/details were to be announced thereafter. This acquisition was completed and Pacific Brands was consumed by Hanesbrands.

=== Timeline ===
- 1893 – The Dunlop Pneumatic Tyre Company opened a brand and factory in Melbourne.^{[5]}
- 1915 – Bonds founded by George Alan Bond.^{[6]}
- 1920 – Bonds start producing the Men's Athletic Singlet, also referred to as the Chesty Bond.^{[7]}
- 1929 – Commences manufacturing of footwear with rubber boots.
- 1937 – Entered sporting goods market with the acquisition of Empire Racket Company.^{[8]}
- 1939 – Dunlop Volley invented, inspired by tennis player and Dunlop employee Adrian Quist
- 1960 – Produced Sleepmaker inner spring mattresses.

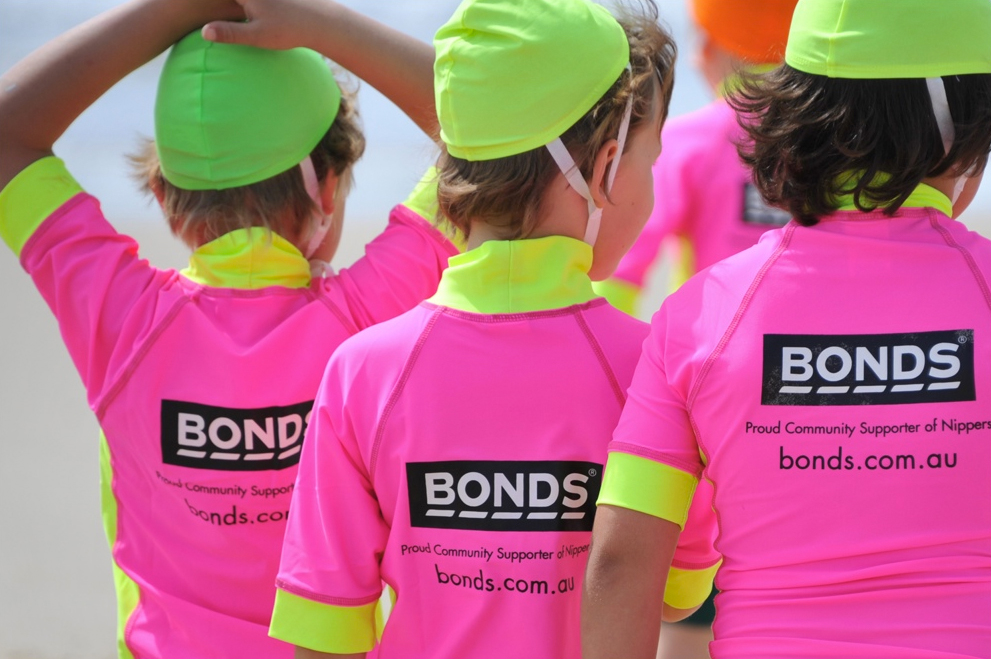
Bonds sponsors the Nippers surf lifesaving program

- 1969 – Entered the underwear and socks market with the acquisition of Holeproof and Berlei Hestia Ltd
- 1971 – Created branded footwear business with the acquisition of Grosby.
- 1982 – Acquired Paul Winestock's business, which acted as the catalyst for the company's movement into footwear importing.^{[9]}
- 1985 – Formed Pacific Brands as a consumer goods division of Pacific Dunlop.^{[10]}
- 1987 – Strengthened its position in the underwear and hosiery market with the acquisition of Bonds.^{[11]}
- 1994 – First Sheridan Boutique stores opened in Double Bay and St Ives.
- 1995 – Entered the outerwear market with the purchase of Boydex International Pty Ltd.
- 1997 – Established wholly owned bra manufacturing factory in Indonesia, through the formation of PT Berlei Indonesia.
- 2000 – Developed branded footwear business with the acquisition of the Australian licences for Clarks and Hush Puppies.^{[12]}
- 2000 – Was one of the largest suppliers to the 2000 Sydney Olympic Games.
- 2001 – Acquired Sara Lee Apparel Australia Business (including King Gee, Playtex, Razzamatazz and Stubbies).^{[13]}
- 2002 – Pacific Brands was spun off from Pacific Dunlop and sold to CVC Asia Pacific and Catalyst Investment Managers.^{[14]}
- 2002 – PT Berlei becomes WRAP (Worldwide Responsible Accredited Production) certified.^{[15]}
- 2003 – Acquired Kolotex hosiery^{[16]} and Sachi women's footwear.^{[17]}
- 2004 – Listed on the Australian Stock Exchange and New Zealand Stock Exchange.^{[18]}
- 2005 – Obtained Merrell Footwear distribution licence.^{[19]}
- 2005 – Acquired Sheridan business including Actil and Arthur Ellis (Homewares New Zealand and Everwarm Survival businesses).^{[20]}

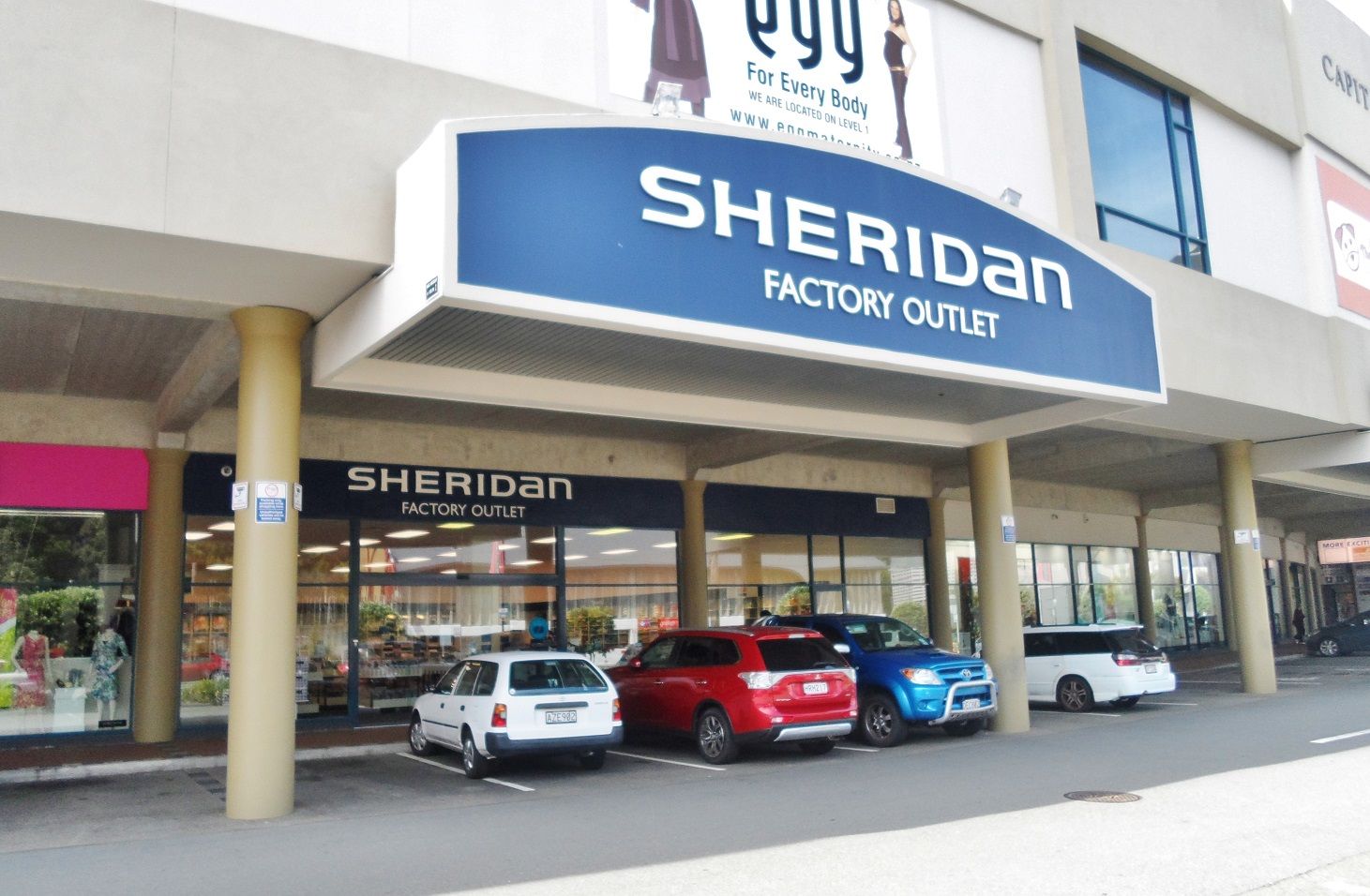
Sheridan Factory Outlet in Wellington, New Zealand

- 2006 – Acquired Peri and Foam Products Australia (FPA).^{[21]}
- 2007 – Acquired the streetwear division of Globe International (brands include Mooks, Mossimo, Paul Frank, Superdry and Stüssy).
- 2007 – Became a market leader in the workwear category by acquiring the Yakka group of companies (including the Yakka, Hard Yakka, Can't Tear 'Em, Stylecorp, NNT Uniforms, Wrangler and Lee Jeans brands) from the Laidlaw family.^{[23]}
- 2008 – Berlei launched the Barely There bra.
- 2008 – Signed up to the Ethical Trading Initiative (ETI). Pacific Brands is the founding Australian company to join the ETI – a tripartite organisation involving companies, unions and NGOs. The Code is widely acknowledged as a model code of labour practice, and is derived from the Conventions of the International Labour Organisation (ILO).^{[24]}
- 2009 – The Ethical Trading Initiative rated the company as Beginner.
- 2009 – In dealing with the GFC, the company unveiled its new strategy which would see it exit the majority of its local manufacturing and focus on competitive sourcing alternatives offshore. Announced it will lay off 1,850 staff and close most manufacturing sites in Australia, saying they are no longer economically viable.^{[25]} As part of this transformation, the company undertook capital raising and debt refinancing, raising $165m and refinancing its debt across a range of banks.^{[26]}
- 2009 – Donated in excess of AU $500,000 worth of products to the Salvation Army and in excess of AU $50,000 cash to The Red Cross to assist in dealing with the bushfire crises in Australia at that time. Its staff also volunteered time to assist in the response effort.
- 2010 – The Ethical Trading Initiative increased the company's rating from Beginner to Improver.
- 2010 – Sold its Chinese Grosby shoe factory, signaling a complete exit from footwear manufacturing. As part of the same deal, it sold its UK footwear business.
- 2010 – Tontine introduced a date-stamped pillow, and suggested that Australians should change their pillows every two years. Research conducted by the brand found that a pillow could grow a complex ecosystem made up of dead skin cells and the things that feed on them. The research also showed there was an average of 9 pillows in every Australian home, with the average age of the oldest pillow being 5.7 years.^{[27]}
- 2011 – Sold its Sleepmaker and Dunlop Foams business to New Zealand company Sleepyhead and sold its Leisure and Fitness business (including Malvern Star Bicycles) to New Zealand's Sheppard Cycles.
- 2011 – Acquired the Brands United business from Gazal, which comprised 13 underwear and hosiery retail outlets.^{[29]}
- July 2011 – Launched www.sheridan.com.au.
- November 2011 – Launched www.bonds.com.au.^{[30]}
- 2011 – The Ethical Trading Initiative increased the company's rating from Improver to Achiever.
- 2012 – Volley was the official "dress" shoe of the Australian Olympic Team, who wore a specially designed shoe as part of their uniform during the opening and closing ceremonies at the London Olympics. A limited number of the shoes were offered for sale to the public through Big W outlets.^{[31]}
- May 2012 – BONDS opened its first retail store in Westfield Doncaster, Victoria.^{[32]}
- 2013 – Acquired UK corporate clothing company, Incorporatewear Ltd.^{[33]}
- December 2013 – Became a signatory to the Bangladesh Accord.^{[34]}
- 2014 – Sold its Workwear portfolio to Wesfarmers for $180 million. The sale included the brands Stubbies, King Gee and Hard Yakka.^{[35]}
- 2014 – Sold its footwear and sport portfolio (known as "Brand Collective") in three transactions. The sale incorporated Clarks, Hush Puppies, Julius Marlow, Volley, Mossimo, Superdry, Dunlop, Slazenger, Everlast, Grosby, Harrison and Freshjive.
- 2015 – Signed three new brand ambassadors: Iggy Azalea for Bonds, Jessica Marais for Berlei Sensation and a global extension with Serena Williams for Berlei Sport.
- 2015 – Celebrated Bonds' 100th anniversary.
- 2015 – Acquired Crestell pillow and bedding accessories business, encompassing the Crestell, Biozone, Dream-a-way and Natures Dreams brands.
- 2016 – Acquired by Hanesbrands for $800 million.

== Ethical trading ==
As a founding Australian member in 2008 of the Ethical Trading Initiative (ETI), which is an independent and internationally recognised code of labour practice, founded on the conventions of the International Labour Organisation, annually discloses its ethical sourcing program to the ETI, including continuous improvement initiatives.

ETI members must adopt their principles of implementation, which set out the approach to ethical trade, including the requirements for companies to demonstrate a clear commitment to integrate ethical trade into their core business practices; to drive ongoing improvements to worker welfare and working conditions, for example through advice and training; and report openly and accurately about their activities.

Since joining the ETI in 2008, Pacific Brands has demonstrated leadership and yearly improvements which has seen its membership status upgraded from Beginner in 2008, to Improver in 2010 and to Achiever in 2011.

Pacific Brands is also a signatory to the Bangladesh Accord and is committed to driving safe working conditions in the country, notwithstanding that the Company does not currently source from Bangladesh.

== Controversies ==
=== Local manufacturing ===
Pacific Brands have been criticised by union groups for their decision to move manufacturing overseas. In 2009, the board of Pacific Brands announced the redundancy of 1,850 employees, as part of a plan to move manufacturing operations to China. Union groups protested against the decision.

=== Human rights ===
Oxfam Australia has urged Pacific Brands to adopt transparent and independent auditing practices of its workers' conditions in its supply chain, as an initial step towards ensuring respect for the rights of workers.

=== Executive remuneration ===
During Morphet's leadership of Pacific Brands, sales had fallen by 15 per cent and net profit by 40 per cent. EPS decreased from 11.5 cents/share to 3.0 cents/share.

In October 2011, Pacific Brands shareholders voiced their disapproval for its remuneration report. There was a backlash from investors due to Pacific Brands bonuses. Although shareholders have had the right to vote on remuneration reports since 2005, the results of the shareholder vote were not binding on the board. Under the new rule, a company will be obliged to hold a spill vote of its board if its remuneration report is not supported by 75% or more shareholders for two years in a row. In the following year, shareholders supported the remuneration report, avoiding a second strike.

== See also ==
- List of sock manufacturers
