= Snipe Diamond =

1980s British ultralight aircraft

- Front quarter view of the Snipe Diamond

General information
- Type: Ultralight aircraft
- National origin: United Kingdom
- Manufacturer: Snipe Aircraft Developments Ltd
- Designer: Arthur Luff
- Number built: 1

History
- First flight: 1985

The Diamond was a British single seat ultralight aircraft, developed by Arthur Luff in the 1980s. It was notable for its radical design.

== Design and development ==
Arthur Luff, a former Rolls Royce engineer and an RAF gliding instructor, designed a closed wing aircraft. Originally called the Snipe, it was later termed the Diamond, in acknowledgement of the wings' configuration. The aircraft featured two wings, of equal span and chord, with the front wing swept back by 20° and the rear wing swept forward by 20°. The wings were joined at the wingtip, where tip rudders were located. The aircraft had a fully enclosed fuselage, and was equipped with a single engine, powering a tractor propeller, and had a tricycle undercarriage. The aircraft featured three-axis control, with pitch control being by elevators on the rear wing; roll control by ailerons located on the outboard wings; directional control by rudders incorporated into the wingtip fins.

== Operational history ==
The prototype made its maiden flight in 1985. According to Flightline, in its issue dated July–August 1985, an order for 15 aircraft had been received from the Middle East. Since 1985, no further news about the craft has appeared.

== Specifications ==
Data from Ultralight and Microlight Aircraft

General characteristics

- Crew: 1
- Length: 13 ft 4 in (4.06 m)
- Wingspan: 24 ft (7.3 m)
- Wing area: 132 sq ft (12.3 m^{2})
- Empty weight: 150 lb (68 kg)
- Max takeoff weight: 370 lb (168 kg)
- Powerplant: 1 × JPX PUL 425 2 cylinder, 2 stroke, 22 hp (16 kW)
- Propellers: 2-bladed, 3 ft 4 in (1.02 m) diameter

Performance

- g limits: +5/-3
- Wing loading: 2.80 lb/sq ft (13.7 kg/m^{2})

== See also ==
Aircraft of comparable role, configuration, and era

- FlyNano Nano
- Ligeti Stratos
