= FlyNano Nano =

Finnish ultralight seaplane

Nano
- The FlyNano Proto prototype on its first flight on 11 June 2012

General information
- Type: Single-seat seaplane, under 70kg
- National origin: Finland
- Manufacturer: FlyNano
- Designer: Aki Suokas
- Status: Production completed
- Number built: one prototype

History
- Introduction date: 2011
- First flight: 11 June 2012

The FlyNano Nano is a Finnish electric single seat seaplane, designed by Aki Suokas and produced by FlyNano of Lahti. It was introduced at AERO Friedrichshafen in 2011 and the prototype Proto version first flew on 11 June 2012. When it was available the aircraft was supplied as a complete ready-to-fly-aircraft.

By 2022 the company website domain was for sale and it is likely that the company ceased operations in about 2020.

== Design and development ==
The aircraft was designed to comply with the EC 216/2008 Annex 2 (j) rules for deregulated class under 70 kg (154 lb) empty weight. It features a joined wing box wing, a single-seat open cockpit without a windshield, a hull for water operations, but no wheeled landing gear and a single electric engine in tractor configuration mounted above the cockpit.

The aircraft is made from carbon fibre. Its 4.8 m (15.7 ft) span wing has no flaps. The initial plan was to produce several models with different powerplant options, including a two-stroke powered ultralight, a high-powered racing model and an electric model. The company has more recently announced that only the electric model will be produced, citing that "it's quiet, efficient, eco-friendly and it's easy to maintain". The aircraft wing can be removed for storage or ground transportation.

== Specifications (Nano) ==
Data from Bayerl and FlyNano

General characteristics

- Crew: one
- Length: 3.8 m (12 ft 6 in)
- Wingspan: 4.8 m (15 ft 9 in)
- Empty weight: 70 kg (154 lb)
- Gross weight: 200 kg (441 lb)
- Powerplant: 1 × electric motor

Performance

- Cruise speed: 140 km/h (87 mph, 76 kn)
- Service ceiling: 3,000 m (9,800 ft)
- Maximum glide ratio: 6:1

== See also ==
Aircraft of comparable role, configuration, and era

- Ligeti Stratos
- Snipe Diamond
