= Surfboard lock =

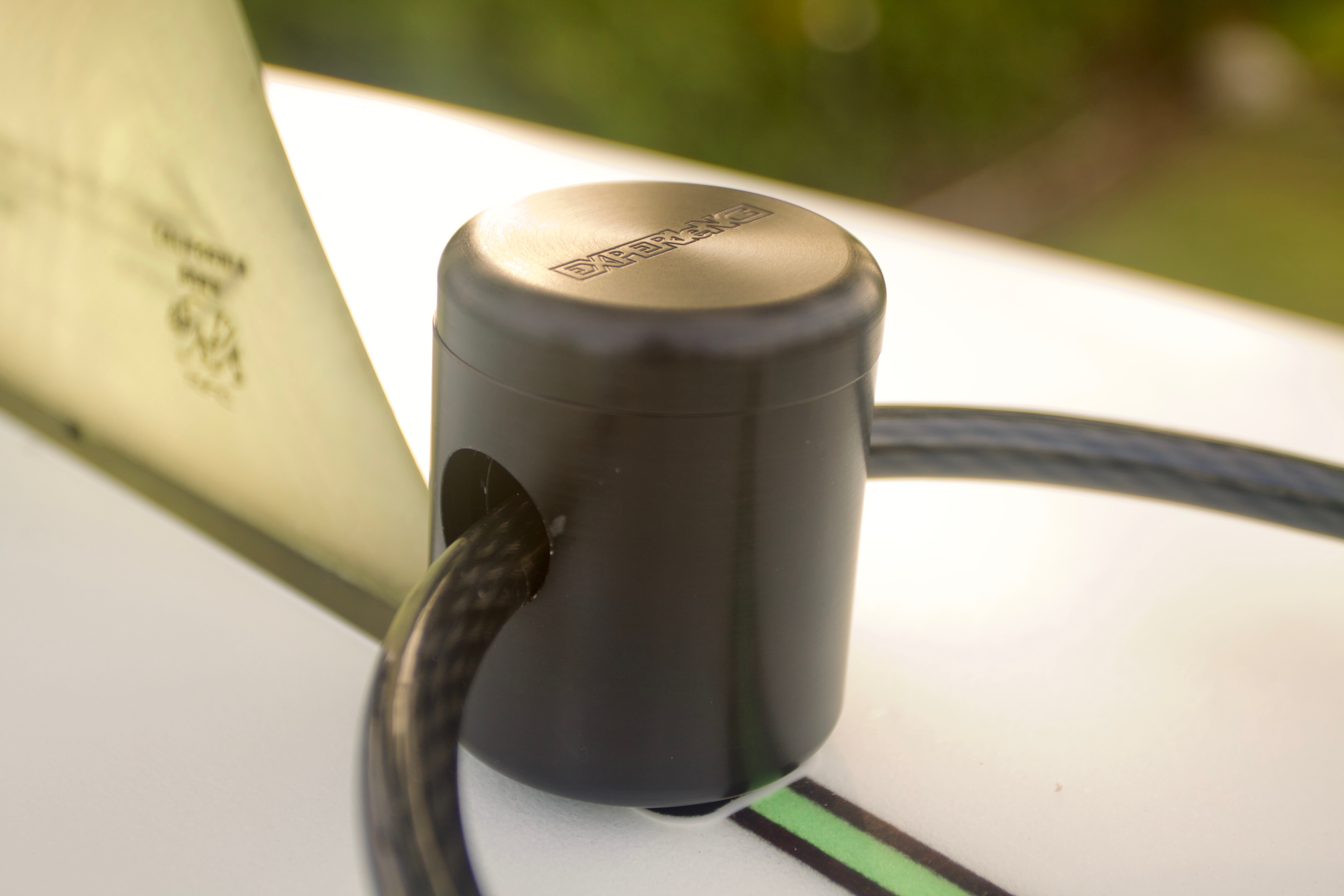
Surfboard lock and SUP lock.

A surfboard lock is a device or a mechanism for securing a surfboard to prevent theft or loss. Typically surfboard locks attach to some part of the surfboard, such as the leash plug or center fin box slot. Alternately, some locking devices clamp or strap around the surfboard. Once the board is secured, the locking device attaches to some hard point like a vehicle or a non-movable object.

== Background ==
Many surfboard locks use wire rope or wire cable to make the connection from the interface point on the surfboard to the securing object. Some surfboards do not have a leash plug, or a fin box or both. Therefore, based upon the design of the surfboard one or more locking devices may or may not work.

== Types ==
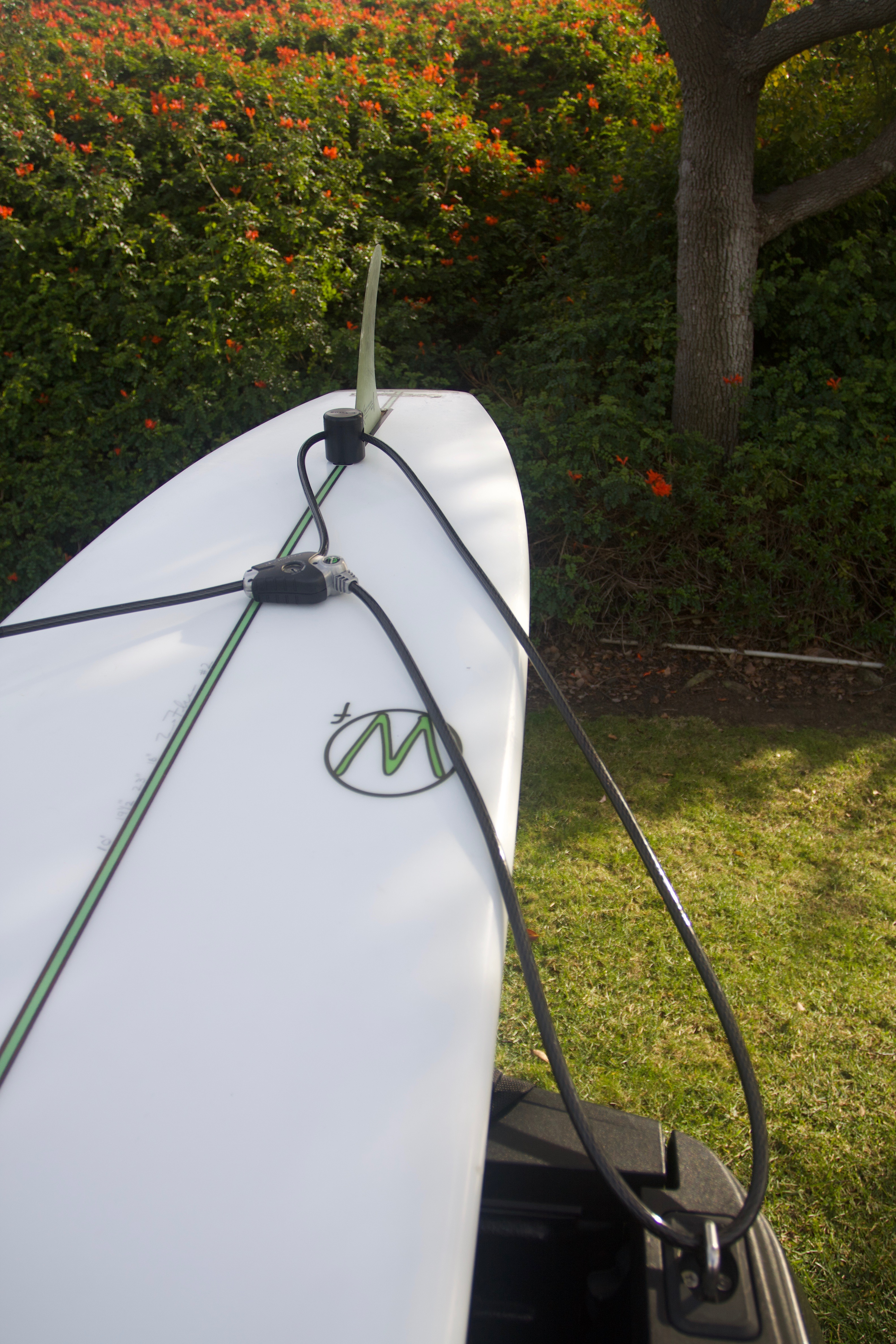
Surfboard Lock.

Locking devices for surfboards tend to group into four basic categories:

- Lashing devices
- Board clamping devices
- Mechanical attachment to the leash plug
- Mechanical attachment to the fin box

A lashing device is a rope, wire cable, or strap which wraps around the board and essentially ties it up with some sort of locking device. A simple low-cost way to do this is to wrap chain around the surfboard and secure it with a lock. Board clamping devices are large mechanical clamps that wrap around the board and (like the lashing product) secure the board by hugging it. Oftentimes, these clamping devices can be hard mounted in a truck bed or on the roof of a car to act as a carrying rack. Mechanical attachments to the board hardpoints such as the leash plug and fin box vary widely in their configuration but are generally some sort of attaching mechanism which grabs onto or into the board and then secured with a lock.

== See also ==
- Glossary of surfing
