= Closed wing =

Aircraft wing configuration with a non-planar, continuous surface wing

A closed wing is a wing that effectively has two main planes that merge at their ends so that there are no conventional wing tips. Closed wing designs include the annular wing (commonly known as the cylindrical or ring wing), the joined wing, the box wing, and spiroid tip devices.

Like many wingtip devices, the closed wing aims to reduce the wasteful effects associated with wingtip vortices that occur at the tips of conventional wings. Although the closed wing has no unique claim on such benefits, many closed wing designs do offer structural advantages over a conventional cantilever monoplane.

== Characteristics ==
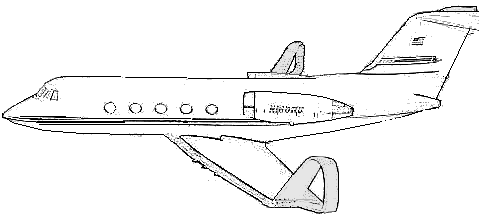
The Spiroid winglet is a closed wing surface attached to the tip of a conventional wing.

Wingtip vortices form a major component of wake turbulence and are associated with induced drag, which is a significant contributor to total drag in most regimes. A closed wing avoids the need for wingtips and thus might be expected to reduce wingtip drag effects.

In addition to potential structural advantages over open cantilevered wings, closed wing surfaces have some unique aerodynamic properties:

- For a lifting system constrained to fit within a rectangular box of fixed horizontal (spanwise) and vertical dimensions as viewed in the freestream flow direction, the configuration that provides the absolute minimum induced drag for a given total vertical lift is a closed system, i.e. a rectangular box wing with lifting surfaces fully occupying all four boundaries of the allowed rectangular area. However, the induced-drag performance of the ideal closed box wing can be approached very closely by open configurations such as the C-wing discussed below.
- For any lifting system (or portion of a lifting system) that forms a closed loop as viewed in the freestream flow direction, the optimum lift (or circulation) distribution that yields the minimum induced drag for a given total vertical lift is not unique, but is defined only to within a constant on the closed-loop portion. This is because, regardless of what the circulation distribution is to start with, a constant circulation can be added to the closed-loop portion without changing the total lift of the system or the induced drag. This is the key to explaining how the C-wing produces nearly the same induced-drag reduction as the corresponding fully closed system, as discussed below.

The upshot is that although closed systems can produce large induced-drag reductions relative to a conventional planar wing, there is no significant aerodynamic advantage that uniquely accrues to their being closed rather than open.

=== Configurations ===
Various types of closed wing have been described:

- Box wing
- Rhomboidal wing
- Flat annular wing
- Concentric wing and fuselage

== History ==
=== Pioneer years ===
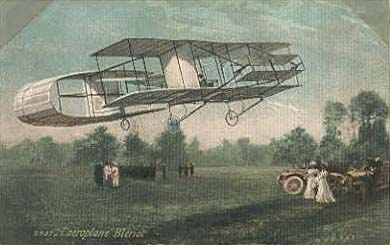
The Blériot IV replaced the forward one of its predecessor's annular wings with a conventional biplane wing

An early example of the closed wing was on the Blériot III aircraft, built in 1906 by Louis Blériot and Gabriel Voisin. The lifting surfaces comprised two annular wings mounted in tandem. The later Blériot IV replaced the forward annular wing with a biplane and added a canard foreplane to make it a three-surface aircraft. It was able to leave the ground in small hops before being damaged beyond repair.

Based on the work of G.J.A. Kitchen, Cedric Lee and G. Tilghman Richards built and flew several annular-wing aeroplanes in which the fore and aft segments were on the same level. The first was a biplane. It was followed by a series of monoplanes, the last of the line remaining in use until 1914.

=== World War II ===
In 1944, the German designer Ernst Heinkel began working on an annular-wing VTOL multirole single-seater called the Lerche, but the project was soon abandoned.

=== Postwar ===
During the 1950s, the French company SNECMA developed the Coléoptère, a single-person VTOL annular wing aircraft. The aircraft proved dangerously unstable despite the development and testing of several prototypes, and the design was abandoned. Later proposals for closed-wing designs included the Convair Model 49 Advanced Aerial Fire Support System (AAFSS) and the 1980s Lockheed "Ring Wing" concept.

Dr. Julian Wolkovitch continued to develop the idea in the 1980s, claiming it was an efficient structural arrangement in which the horizontal tail provided structural support for the wing as well as acting as a stabilizing surface.

The Spiroid winglet, a design currently under development by Aviation Partners, is a closed wing surface mounted at the end of a conventional wing. The company announced that the winglets fitted to a Gulfstream II reduced fuel consumption in the cruise phase by over 10%.

The Finnish company FlyNano flew a prototype of a closed wing ultralight aircraft, the FlyNano Nano on 11 June 2012.

The Belarusian built OW-1 experimental aircraft has since its maiden flight in 2007, been the only crewed annular closed wing aircraft to have successfully maintained stable horizontal flight. Flight tests showed that annular closed wing aircraft are less affected by cross wind than planes with other wing configurations.

An annular closed wing

Miscellaneous modern examples include:

- Stanford study
- Lockheed ring-wing

Closed wings remain mostly confined to the realms of studies and conceptual designs, as the engineering challenges of developing a strong, self-supporting closed wing for use in the large airliners that would benefit most from increases in efficiency have yet to be overcome.

The closed wing is also used in water, for surfboard fins of the type also known as the tunnel fin.

=== Lockheed Martin Environmentally Responsible Aviation Project ===
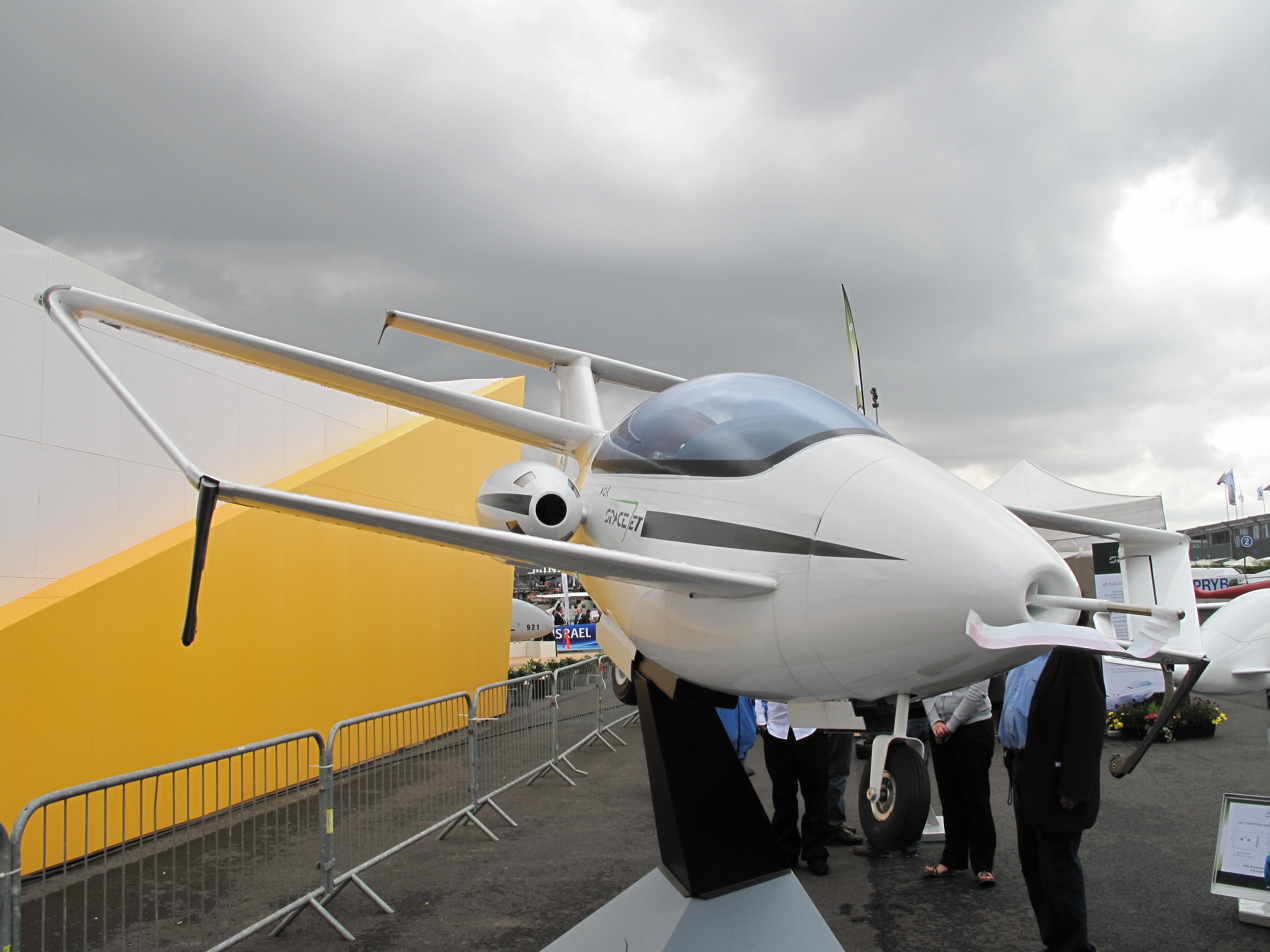
AOK Spacejet at Paris Air Show 2013

During 2011, the Environmentally Responsible Aviation Project at NASA's Aeronautics Research Mission Directorate invited study proposals towards meeting NASA's goal of reducing future aircraft fuel consumption by 50% compared to 1998. Lockheed Martin proposed a box wing design along with other advanced technologies.

=== Prandtl Box Wing ===
In 1924, the German aerodynamicist Ludwig Prandtl suggested that a box wing, under certain conditions, might provide the minimum induced drag for a given lift and wingspan. In his design, two offset horizontal wings have vertical wings connecting their tips and shaped to provide a linear distribution of side forces. The configuration is said to offer improved efficiency for a range of aircraft.

In the 1980s, the Ligeti Stratos used this approach. The name "PrandtlPlane" was coined in the 1990s in research by Aldo Frediani et al. of the University of Pisa. It is currently also used in some ultralight aircraft.

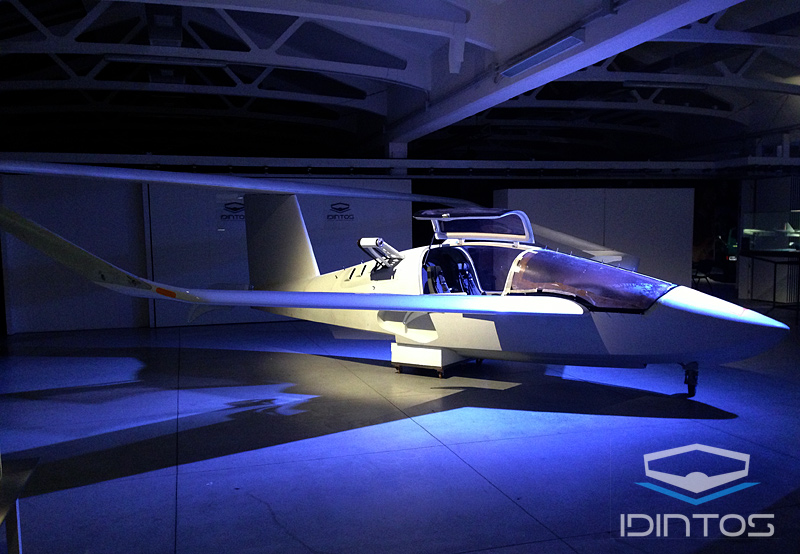
Full-scale prototype of an ultralight amphibious PrandtlPlane, developed during IDINTOS project and presented at Creactivity 2013 (Pontedera, Italy)

IDINTOS (IDrovolante INnovativo TOScano) is a research project, co-funded by the regional government of Tuscany (Italy) in 2011 in order to design and manufacture an amphibious ultralight PrandtlPlane. The research project has been carried out by a consortium of Tuscan public and private partners, led by the Aerospace Section of the Civil and Industrial Engineering Department of Pisa University, and has resulted in the manufacturing of a 2-seater VLA prototype.

The configuration is also claimed to be theoretically efficient for wide-body jet airliners. The largest commercial airliner, the Airbus A380, must make efficiency trade-offs to keep the wingspan below the 80-meter limit at most airports, but a closed wing with optimal wingspan could be shorter than that of conventional designs, potentially allowing even larger aircraft to use the current infrastructure.

== C-wing ==
The C-wing is a theoretical configuration in which much of the upper centre section of a box wing is removed, creating a wing that folds up and over at the tips but does not rejoin in the centre. A C-wing can achieve very nearly the same induced-drag performance as a corresponding box wing, as shown by the calculations illustrated below.

Each of the first three rows in the illustration shows a different C-wing configuration as it is taken through a sequence of theoretical induced-drag calculations in which the wingtips are brought closer together, culminating in the limiting case on the right, where the gap has been taken to zero and the configuration has become a closed box wing (referred to as the "Quasi-closed C-wing" because the calculations were carried out in the limit as the gap went to zero).

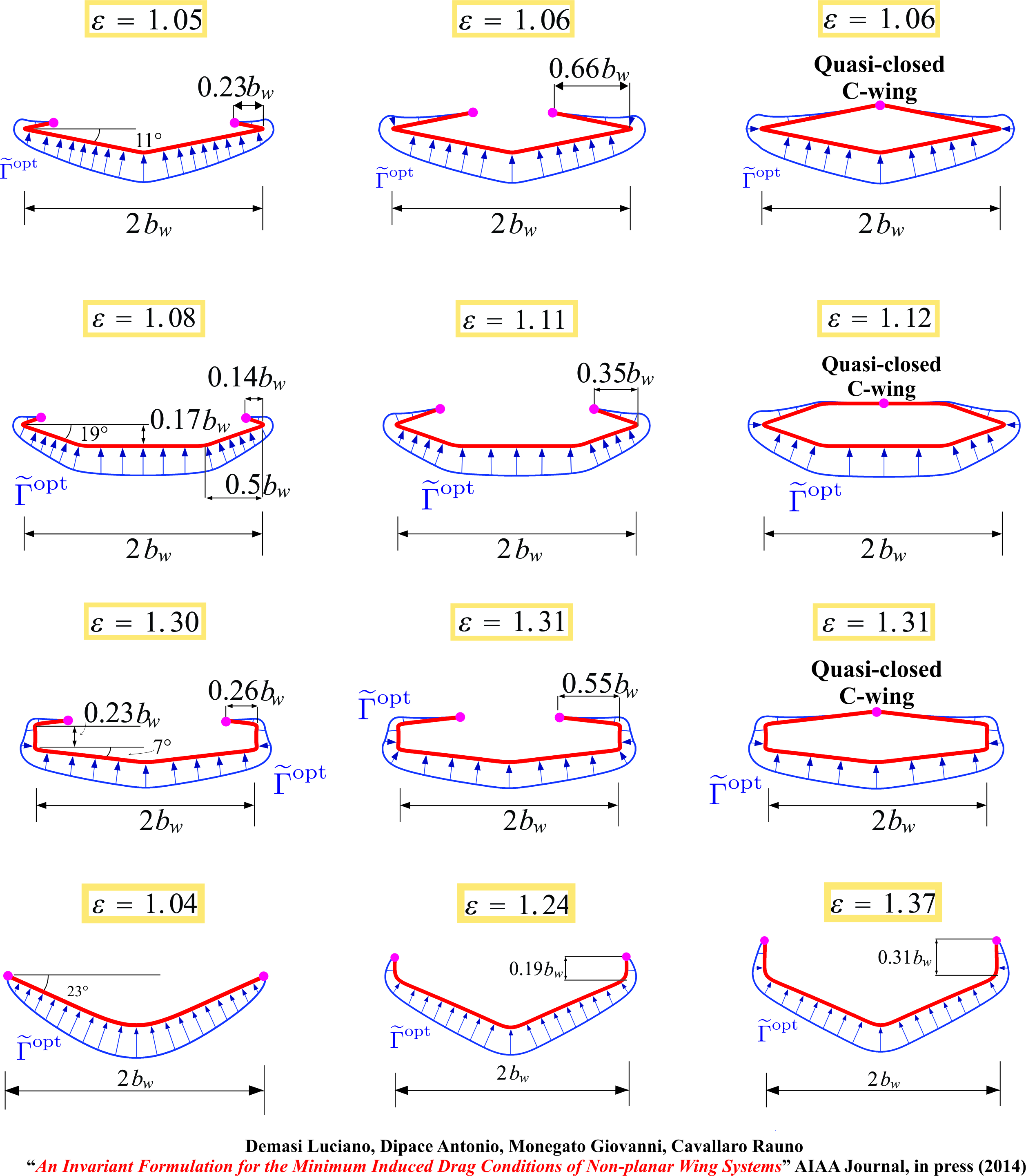
Nonplanar wings: results for the optimal aerodynamic efficiency ratio ε

The parameter ε is the optimal aerodynamic efficiency ratio and represents the ratio between the aerodynamic efficiency of a given non-planar wing and the corresponding efficiency of a reference classical cantilevered wing with the same wing span and total lift. Both efficiencies are evaluated for their respective optimal lift distributions. Values of ε greater than 1 indicate lower induced drag than that of a classical cantilevered wing for which ε = 1.

Note that all of the C-wing configurations have ε greater than 1 and that there is little difference (no difference to the two decimal places shown in two of the cases) between a configuration with a substantial gap (the second entry in each row) and the corresponding closed configuration (the third entry in each row). This is because the optimum lift loading calculated for the quasi-closed cases is very small over the upper centre section, and that part of the wing can be removed with little change in lift or drag.

The lift distributions shown here for the quasi-closed cases look different from those typically shown for box wings in the classical literature (see Durand figure 81, for example). The classical solution in Durand was obtained by a conformal-mapping analysis that happened to be formulated in a way that led to equal upward loadings on the horizontal panels of the box. But the optimum lift distribution is not unique. A constant inward loading (corresponding to a particular constant circulation) can be added to a classical loading like that shown by Durand to obtain a loading like those in the quasi-closed cases below. The two methods of analysis give different-looking versions of the optimum loading that are not fundamentally different. Except for small differences due to the numerical method used for the quasi-closed cases, the two kinds of loading are in principle just shifted versions of each other.
