= Surfboard fin =

Part of a surfboard

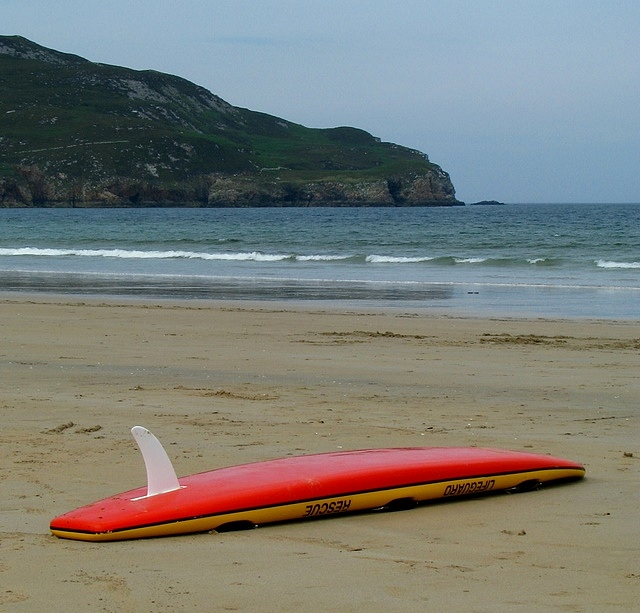
Surfboard fins can help surfers control their boards

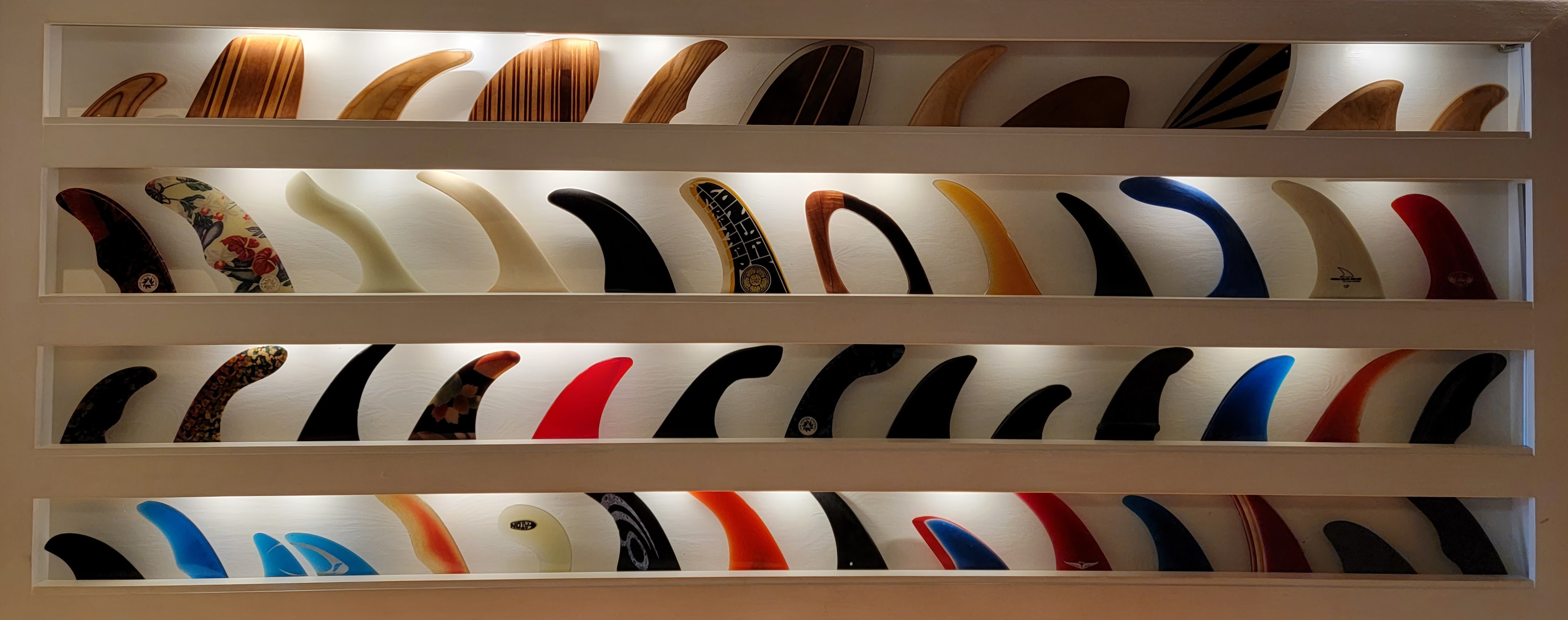
A selection of surfboard fins

A surfboard fin or skeg is a hydrofoil mounted at the tail of a surfboard or similar board to improve directional stability and control through foot-steering. Fins can provide lateral lift opposed to the water and stabilize the board's trajectory, allowing the surfer to control direction by varying their side-to-side weight distribution. The introduction of fins in the 1930s revolutionized surfing and board design. Surfboard fins may be arrayed in different numbers and configurations, and many different shapes, sizes, and materials are and have been made and used.

== History ==
Traditional Hawaiian surfboards had no fins. On these boards, some amount of control could be achieved through convex hulls and the surfer dragging a foot in the water. A common problem with these early boards was "sliding ass", in which the tail would slip sideways, usually causing a wipeout. The first fixed fin was introduced by surfing pioneer Tom Blake in 1935. In Waikiki, Blake attached a 30 cm (12 in) long, 10 cm (4 in) deep metal keel from an abandoned speedboat to his surfboard, and was immediately impressed with the results. Around 1936, Woody Brown independently added a fixed fin to his second surfboard design in San Diego, which further popularized the feature.

The stability and control fins allowed revolutionized the sport, though many surfers avoided them for several years. The feature grew more common in the mid-1940s and became the universal industry standard in the 1950s. Experimentation with fin design and configuration increased after 1966 with the popularization of shortboards. Parallel double fins, first introduced in the 1940s by Bob Simmons, became periodically popular. In 1980, Simon Anderson introduced the three-fin "Thruster" design, which has since become standard.

== Configurations ==
In surfing, there are two major types of (typically stationary) surfboard fins (hydrofoils), and a host of illustrative issues.

Both a skeg and "rail fins" stabilize the motion of the surfboard. They also contribute to the desired effect of converting the (kinetic energy) push of the sloped wave face combined with the rider's mass on the sloped wave face (potential energy) into redirected energy – lift (lift (physics)) – the surfer deflects their surfboard and fins off the water of the wave face (and/or vice versa) to make forward progress across the wave face, or "down the line," that is, parallel to the wave crest and beach – riding parallel to the crest (perpendicular to the pull of gravity down the wave's slope) in this way is known as "trimming." Lift (aka "drive") from the board and its fin(s) is what enables all maneuvers in surfing.

A "skeg" (an upright, streamlined, often raked keel) typically denotes one centrally mounted stabilizer foil mounted perpendicularly to the riding surface, at the rear of the surfboard.

Smaller surfboard fins mounted near the edge (or "rail") of the surfboard are known as "rail fins" and are seen in multi-fin arrangements (often in combination with a similarly sized central fin further back on the board). Rail fins enable high-performance surfing, and are most often "single-foiled," with one flat side and one "foiled" side, as seen on an airfoil, for greater lift.

A fin configuration with fins near the edge of the board stabilizes and contributes lift during turning maneuvers, which contributes to the board's ability to "hold" during turning maneuvers. Rail fins are often seen in addition to a central fin, but can be used without a central fin as well. Some of the most popular multi-fin configurations use two rail fins (a "twin-fin"), two rail fins plus a similar-sized central fin mounted further back (e.g. a "Thruster"), or four fins (a "quad"). Rail fins are more or less engaged by the rider's heel and toes as they lean in the desired direction of their turn. As the rider does so, an "inside" rail fin sinks deeper and its angle of attack is increased, as is its lift-induced drag. Rail fins also add lift (known as "drive") in trim and with greater holding ability, enable steeper wave faces to be ridden and higher speed "down the line."

Rail fins are typically "toed-in," that is, the leading edge of the fins are oriented toward the centerline of the surfboard, which decreases the angle of attack in trim, which makes it easier to initiate turns. "Toeing in" rail fins also adds drag on the "outside" fin, as its angle of attack is negative during trim or in a turn. These combined factors of toed-in rail fins cause several issues: drag on a toed-in outside rail fin can slow the board down in trim, but it can also give a braking effect during turns that is useful. The inside rail fin (and the board itself) can be "pumped," attacked and re-attacked, by swerving up and down the face, causing acceleration down the line, or similarly pumped to achieve a desired trajectory through a multi-stage turn. At higher speeds, the drag off toed-in rail fins can cause surfboards to oscillate and become unstable – a phenomenon known as "speed wobbles".

Most surfboards intended for larger waves are longer (to increase hull speed for paddling, wave-catching, and surfing), and as most shapers orient the rail fins toward the nose of the board, a longer board inherently results in reduced toe-in of rail fins, therefore less negative angle of attack, less oscillation, greater stability, and higher speeds. Rail fins also typically have some degree of "cant," that is, are tilted out toward the rail they are adjacent to. This is a significant additional factor in lift at various attitudes, drag, and performance, as are the variables of other foils – including flexibility, thickness, and planform. Rail fins evolved into being and surged into popularity as riders (Simon Anderson, most famously) sought a solution to two major performance issues of a central "single" fin – both related to engagement of the foil: For one, a centrally-mounted fin is tilted up out of the water as the board is leaned over, and thus it loses more and more of its lift as the lean angle increases – if the lean angle is acute enough, the fin's tip can be the only area left in the water; the tip may then rapidly stall and, having lost its lift, become disengaged from the water, leaving the board's bottom as the only control surface still operating. Before rail fins became (extremely) popular, this tendency of "single fins" led to riders "nursing" turns – this tendency was a significant limiting factor on performance. The enhanced hold offered by rail fins during turning led to more types of maneuvers being possible. The other major issue leading to rail fins' use is the fact that a rider can use the lift near the rail to increase speed and performance on smaller waves due to the above effects and abilities of these foils.

Conventional statics fins suffer from the inability to have a camber and attack angle always adapted to variations trajectories. The angles given to rail fins are a compromise generating straight drag and oppositions in maneuvers. The center fin merit of being able to adjust its suction face and its angle with the direction of the turn to avoid the hydrodynamic stall. The fin camber and attack angle needed to accord to the different phases of trajectory. When turning left or right the fins need to adjust the camber and attack angles to avoid hydrodynamic stall, so the Adaptive Dynamic Attack & Camber system (ADAC) brought a solution to this hydrodynamic problem. This surf fin technology introduced adaptable structures with variable geometry inspired by aeronautics and biomimetic in the surf.

In Windsurfing, a derivative of traditional surfing, skegs are also often used as a central stabilizing fin (hydrofoil) located at the rear of the board. A windsurfer's skeg also has the effect of producing lift, which allows the rider to direct the craft laterally against the lift the sail (itself an airfoil) produces. The skeg has undergone numerous phases of development and, as with other foils, its design is determined by the balance of the pressures it experiences in use, including lift, drag (physics), ventilation and stall (flight).

== Types ==
Glass on fins are fins that are permanently connected to the surfboard through fiberglass. This type of fin was mainly used on older model surfboards. Glass on fins are broken easily and are hard to repair. You rarely see these types of fins today because a different type of fin has replaced them.

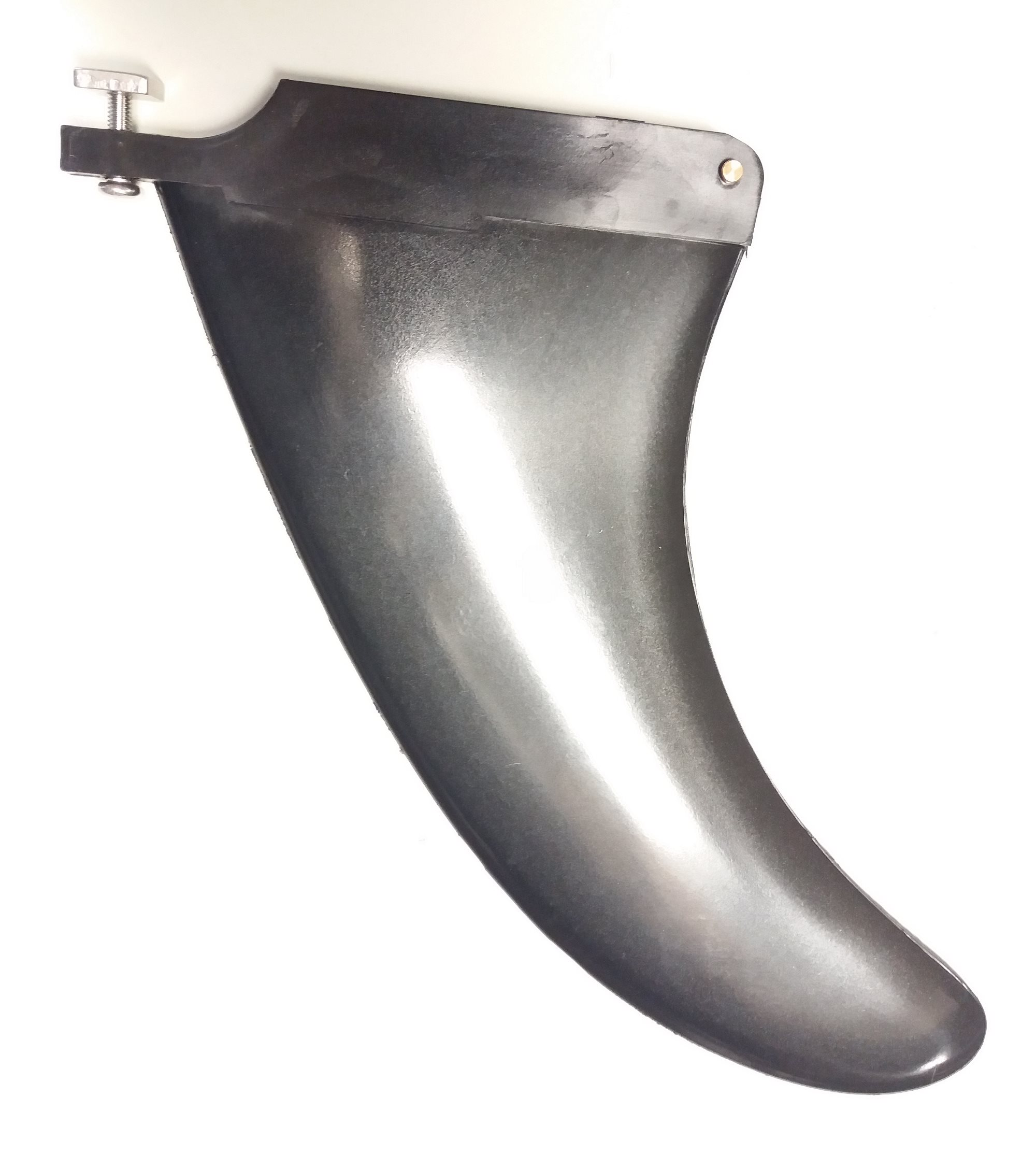
US Box fin

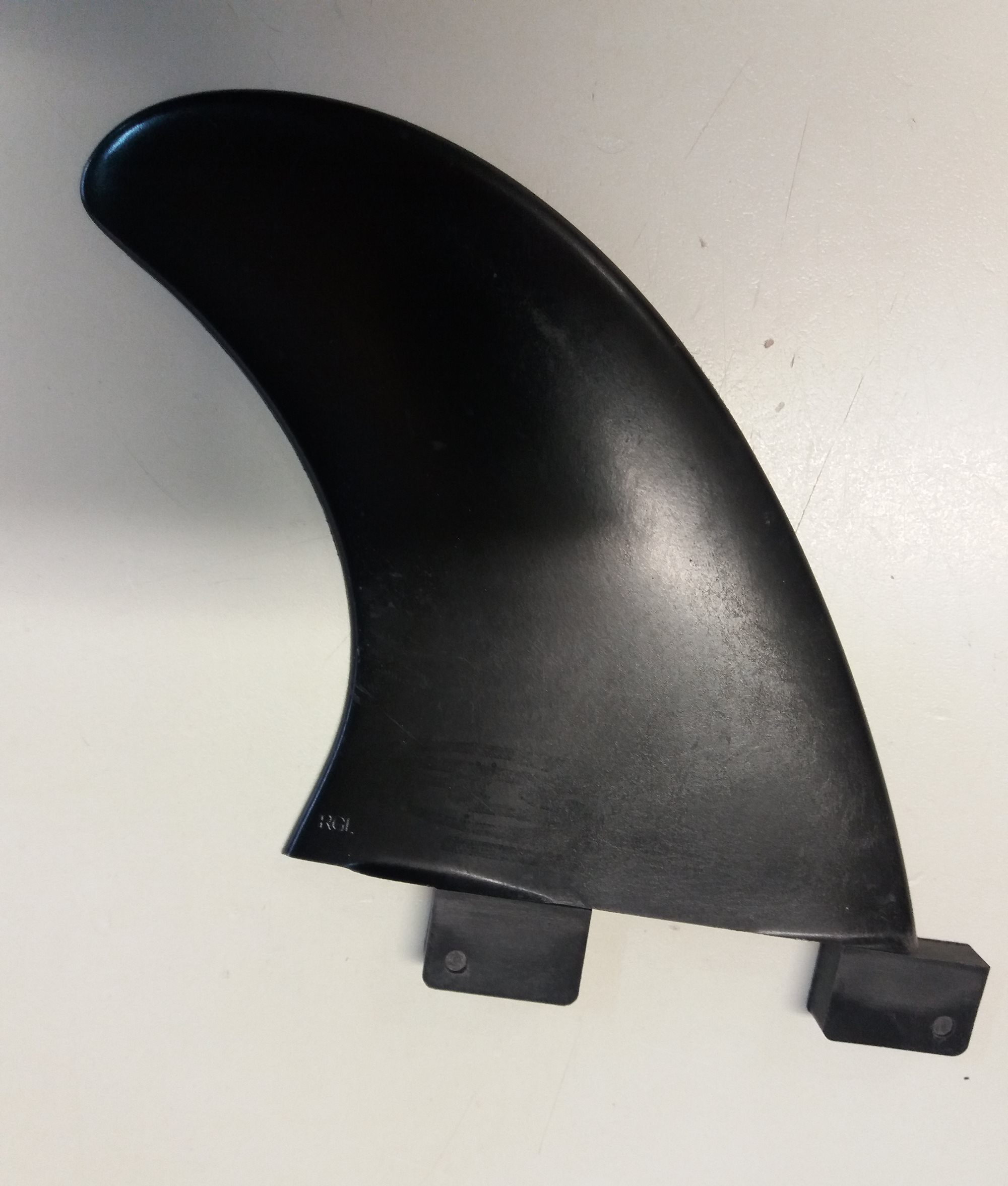
FCS fin

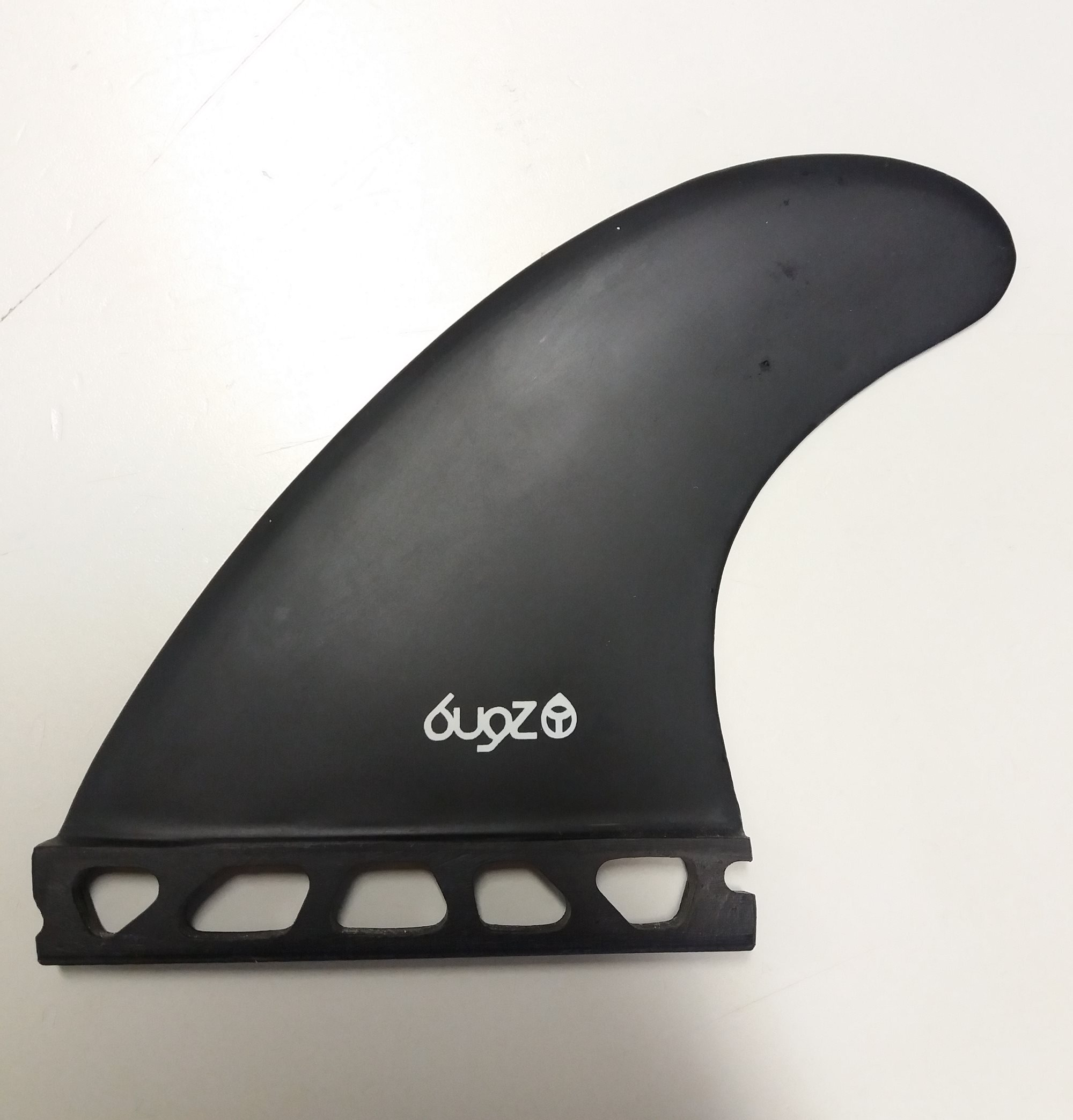
Futures fin

Removable Fin Systems The most common types of fins used today, removable fins are surfboard fins that can be unscrewed from the surfboard and be replaced by different fins or be moved about the board for a different setup in maneuverability and stability. In the early '90s, three Australian surfers invented the fin control system (FCS). The system also streamlined the surfboard manufacturing process by making it easier to install fins into boards and repair damaged fins. The leading competitor to FCS fins is Futures fins. Using a single larger fin box, the manufacturer claims the fins provide a stronger connection and more closely approximate the feeling of a glass on fin. Third, there is the US Box system that is still often used for single fin setups.

Flexible fins are used on most rental boards because of liability. These fins are safer than a hard fin because they reduce the risk of injury, although there is a loss of performance.

ADAC System Adaptive Dynamic Attack & Camber fins. bio-mechanics variable geometry fins able to adjust the attack angle and camber according to the various phases of the trajectory.

Materials Used Nowadays fins are normally made in Plastic or Fiber. Fiber fins are combining different materials to obtain better performance, and better weight and flotation ratios like honeycomb cores, bamboo core, and then glassed with fiber and sometimes reinforced with carbon fiber.

=== Production ===
Tom Blake invented the first fin used on a surfboard. Although Blake's first fin was most like attaching a keel from a boat to the bottom of the board, Blake's finding started the development of the fins in use today.

Bob Simmons and George Greenough later experimented with new types of surfboard fins. Simmons, regarded as the father of the modern surfboard, introduced multiple fins as one of his numerous innovations. Greenough made the fin flexible and took inspiration from the fins of fish.

In the 1970s, multi-fin systems became much more widely used, in competition and by average surfers, as top professionals like Larry Bertlemann and Mark Richards enjoyed competitive success maneuvering shorter boards with twin fins in smaller surf and tighter radius turns.

It was not until the 1980s that Simon Anderson invented the popular thruster set-up (three fins – two on the rail 25–30 cm (10–12 in) from the tail end, one center fin 8–12 cm (3–5 in) up from the tail) which stabilized the board compared to the twin-fin set-up, and provided more control and lifting surfaces in an effective configuration. The design was an immediate competitive success for Anderson, inasmuch as he immediately won two very famous surf contests using "thrusters," and the entire surfing world quickly followed his lead. The thruster is the dominant fin configuration to this day, in both recreational and competition surfing.

== Setups and shapes ==
=== Single fin ===
The single fin setup is the original fin setup. Single fin setups are common on long boards. They are usually long and wider than other fins, which make the board controllable with only the one fin.

=== Twin Fin ===
The twin fin setup has two smaller fins mounted near the rail. They can be either glassed or screwed in (detachable). This setup allows for extra speed and looser turning.

=== Thruster ===
The most common setup, the "thruster" is a tri-fin. All the fins are the same size, with two semi-parallel (slightly toed-in, usually, and slightly canted outward, usually) fins mounted near the rails 25–30 cm (10–12 in) forward of the tail and a middle fin at 8–12 cm (3–5 in).

=== 2+1 setup ===
The 2+1 denotes a larger center fin (for reference, larger than a thruster center fin) with 2 small to medium-small fins at a position close to thruster rail fin positions. The "sidebites" contribute some lift, control, and stability to the board when it is "on rail," arcing through turns. Typically, "sidebites" are removable, so the surfer can take them out for use in smaller waves, which gives less drag and freer turning. The 2+1 is a popular configuration for mid length to long boards.

=== Quad setup ===
The quad setup is four fins, two on each side, in a similar position to the rail fins on a thruster. The fronts are typically larger than the rears but this is not always the case. The rears are nearly always inboard and aft of the fronts. The exact measurements and configuration of the quad set-up can vary widely. This setup is often used in short boards and provides more lift and control surface near the rail. There is no center fin.

=== Twinzer ===
The Twinzer was a four-fin design introduced by Wil Jobson in 1988. It had a narrower tail than the twin-fin designs that preceded it; this feature gave the Twinzer more speed without losing maneuverability.

=== Tunnel fin ===
See Tunnel fin.

=== Bonzer ===
The Bonzer is a 3- or 5- array invented by the Campbell brothers in Oxnard, California in the early 1970s for the powerful waves of a well-known wave near their home. The Bonzer array is an approximately 7" center fin aft and either two or four delta-shaped fins ("runners") mounted near the rails in somewhat similar fashion to other rail fins, but they are substantially lower aspect and aggressively canted outward. The Bonzer array is firmly held to be an integral part of the Campbell brothers' overall board design featuring double concave bottom contours out the tail.

=== Fyn central line ===
The central line configuration comes from optimizations of Dynamic system "ADAC", conducted in France by jf Iglesias, and applied to surf since 2014 with the brand Fyn. US Patent and first import of the system came in the US in 2015. Dynamic system "ADAC" (ref 11) eliminates the need for asymmetric fins antagonists. The central position of fins for more efficient rail supports, it is natural to place the dynamic fins on the center line, to benefit from all the advantages. The configuration on the center line thus increases the force of the rail support, to benefit from the effects of leading edge flaps and adjust the positions of the gaps between the fins (if rear spoiler is mounted USbox) .The configuration on the center line of the dynamic fin has maneuverability and drive the system ADAC and also the effectiveness of the rail support of the central position that was formerly reserved only for singles. (A configuration on the center line with static fins block maneuverability).

=== Dimpled fins ===
3DFINS feature Golf Ball Dimpled technology. 3DFINS Dimple technology is based on the Golfball dimples. A surfboard fin with dimples creates a turbulent flow a fin without Dimples is more a laminar flow. Turbulent flow has more adhesion so when the surfer starts to turn, the dimpled fin surface delays the flow separation, reducing cavitation (the separation bubble) allowing the foil to maintain performance. When the surfer is turning at high speeds, the turbulent boundary layer helps the flow overcome an adverse pressure gradient and allows the fin to remain attached to the surface longer than it would otherwise. This reduces drag, increases lift and improves overall performance of the fin design – a World Tour Proven Innovation that has set the path for 3DFINS as an innovator of Fins. The Dimples are unique to 3DFINS TM (Design Patented, Aust, USA, International Patents Pending). Designed by Australian Surfer/inventor Courtney Potter while working closely with Josh Kerr, Jamie O'Brien and Christian Fletcher and a comprehensive series of Fluid Dynamic testing.

== Dimensions and geometry ==
=== Sweep (rake) ===
The sweep, or rake, is the measurement that determines how far back a fin curves in relation to its base. This is what propels the board. The smaller rake fins will offer greater speed and will be more predictable but less ideal for short, fast turns. Large rake fins let you make tighter turns at the cost of speed.

=== Toe/splay ===
Often defined by the manufacture of the board, the toe or splay of a fin system is the angle of which the side fins are in relation to the board's central stinger. Often side fins are referred to as "Toed-in" with the front of the fin angled towards the middle of the board. This allows water to pressure the outside fins which will ultimately increase responsiveness.

=== Base/length ===
The widest point of a fin is the base, giving the fin strength and is often the part that sits flush with the base of the board once installed. The length of the base will affect the board's responsive behaviours in turns. The longer base creates trajectories for water to propel past, which creates a faster ride. For sharper, more maneuverable fins go for a shorter base.

=== Foil ===
Foil is one of the more important aspects of a fin, referring to the shape of the outside and inside faces of the fin, thinnest near the tip of the fin, and thicker near the base. Altering the flow of water over the fin surface has a direct impact on the performance of the fins and board. Your central fin will always be symmetrical and convex on both sides, this is often referred to as "50/50", this offers even distribution and stability. Outside fins are typically convex on the outside faces and flat or curved inwards on the inside. The flat inside creates a solid balance of control, speed and maneuverability, whilst a curved or concaved inside maximizes lift and minimal drag, more ideal for speed and fluidity.

=== Flex ===
The fin's flexibility or lack of flex significantly impacts the way the board reacts, a more flexible fin offers a more playful experience, where a stiff fin will offer greater speed on hollow waves. Higher-end fins come with both soft and stiff flex patterns being stiff at the base and softer at the tip.

=== Height/depth ===
This is the measurement from the base of the fin, to the tallest point at the tip. The varying height of fins is designed to change a board's stability and grip through turns. If control and surfing relaxed manner is what is wanted, a taller fin is the way to go; shorter fins do not give the water like taller fins, meaning more experienced riders can maneuver the board more freely.

=== Cant ===
Cant is the degree in which the fin sits in relation to the board's base, for example, a fin that is straight up/down has a cant of 90 degrees, this makes the ride faster by carving through the wave more freely. Anything outside the 90 will increase the board's responsive behaviours through turns. Less cant allows for greater acceleration and drive.
