= Ligeti Stratos =

1980s Australian ultralight aircraft

General information
- Type: Ultralight aircraft
- National origin: Australia
- Manufacturer: Ligeti Aero-Nautical Pty Ltd
- Designer: Charles Ligeti
- Status: Destroyed
- Number built: 3

History
- First flight: 25 April 1985

The Stratos was an Australian single seat ultralight aircraft, developed by Charles Ligeti in the 1980s. It was a high-performance aircraft of radical design.

== Design and development ==
Charles Ligeti was a Czechoslovak industrial chemist with experience in mechanical engineering. He commenced design studies for a high-performance aircraft in the 1970s. He migrated to Australia in 1977 with design work then resuming in May 1983. Development included the building and testing of free flight models and a 1/4-scale radio-controlled model.

The Stratos is designed to be stored and transported fully assembled, without any need for disassembly or dismantling. The aircraft was designed to comply with the Australian ANO 95-10 code for ultralight aircraft.

Aerodynamically, the Stratos is a very clean design. The most notable feature is its closed wing configuration, with the sweptback foreplane and the high-mounted mainplane being connected at their wingtips by vertical fins. The pilot sits in a recumbent position in a streamlined nacelle. The engine is mounted at the rear and powers a three-bladed ducted fan. There is no empennage. The undercarriage consists of two non-retractable wheels arranged in tandem, with balancer wheels located under the wingtips.

== Operational history ==
The prototype, piloted by Ligeti, first flew on 25 April, 1985, with him later reporting that the aircraft fulfilled or exceeded all expectations. The prototype was taken to the 1986 EAA Convention at Oshkosh, Wisconsin, where it flew every day for a week. Having returned to Australia, further flight testing was conducted with the prototype.

During testing at Penfield, near Sunbury, Victoria on 22 September 1987, Ligeti lost control of the aircraft, with the craft falling vertically to the ground. The aircraft was destroyed and Ligeti killed. An investigation by the Australian Transport Safety Bureau focused on a change made to the forward wings, so that they had full span elevators, affecting stalling and pitching behaviour.

== Specifications ==
Data from Jane's all the world's aircraft, 1987-88

General characteristics

- Crew: 1
- Length: 2.49 m (8 ft 2 in)
- Wingspan: 5.36 m (17 ft 7 in)
- Height: 0.99 m (3 ft 3 in)
- Wing area: 7.53 m^{2} (81.1 sq ft)
- Airfoil: Wortmann 67
- Empty weight: 78 kg (172 lb)
- Gross weight: 55–83 kg (121–183 lb)
- Max takeoff weight: 188 kg (414 lb)
- Powerplant: 1 × König SD 570 4 cylinder, 2 stroke, 21 kW (28 hp)
- Propellers: 3-bladed, 0.65 m (2 ft 2 in) diameter ducted fan

Performance

- Maximum speed: 200 km/h (120 mph, 110 kn)
- Cruise speed: 97 km/h (60 mph, 52 kn)
- Stall speed: 58 km/h (36 mph, 31 kn)
- Never exceed speed: 270 km/h (170 mph, 150 kn)
- g limits: +9/-6
- Maximum glide ratio: 20
- Wing loading: 24.95 kg/m^{2} (5.11 lb/sq ft) at maximum take-off weight

== See also ==
Aircraft of comparable role, configuration, and era

- FlyNano Nano
- Snipe Diamond
