= Tunnel fin =

Type of fin used on surfboards

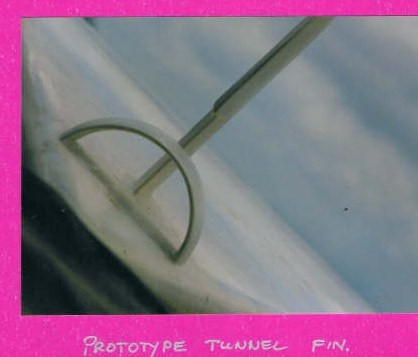
Prototype tunnel fin by Roy Stewart

A tunnel fin is a type of surfboard fin used on surfboards, especially heavy longboards and longboard guns. The weight and length of these boards make it easier to control the fore and aft angle of the tunnel. As the name suggests, it is shaped like a tunnel. Tunnel fins were first used by Richard Deese and Bob Bolen (also known as the Greek) in California during the late sixties and continue to be developed by shapers today.

== Background ==
The Tunnel fin is based on the principle of the annular wing with the lowest drag and highest lift fin configuration possible. It has no drag inducing fin tips, this is important as it means that rail to rail turning movements are drag-free and effortless. Tunnel fins have the ability to enhance hydrodynamics by slightly twisting the water flow into a vortex as it passes through the tunnel, preventing random turbulence in its wake. The tunnel fin has a large amount of horizontal lift utilizing the hydrofoil principle providing better lift-to-drag ratio.

The horizontal area in the tunnel fin also acts as a means of transferring rider energy into forward thrust through board flex (similar to a dolphin tail). As the board pumps up and down it drives the 'fluke' at the tail. In other words, the speed of the tunnel finned board can be increased by weighting and unweighting (pumping). This is slightly different from the side to side movement used by thruster riders.

The ability of the tunnel to organize volumetric flow rate means that (in the case where a central fin is used in front of the tunnel) any turbulence coming off the trailing edge and base of the front fin is organized into a lower drag flow pattern.
