= FlyNano =

Defunct Finnish aircraft manufacturer

FlyNano Oy
- Company type: Private company
- Industry: Aerospace
- Founded: 2010
- Defunct: 2023
- Headquarters: Lahti, Finland
- Key people: Chief designer: Aki Suokas
- Products: Single-seat seaplanes, under 70kg
- Website: www.flynano.com

FlyNano OY was a Finnish aircraft manufacturer based in Lahti. The company specialized in the design and manufacture of single-seat seaplanes built from carbon fibre.

The company's chief designer, Aki Suokas, previously designed several successful sailplanes and light aircraft, including the Eiri-Avion PIK-20, Valmet PIK-23 Towmaster, PIK-27 and the PIK-28.

The company's first product, the FlyNano Proto boxplane flying boat was first presented at the «Aero 2011» in Friedrichshafen and first flown on 11 June 2012. At least three aircraft were produced.

By the Fall 2022, on Facebook page the company announced that deisgn of an UAV variant of the FlyNano Proto was done, showed up renders of the FlyNano Proto 2nd generation and of a two-seater plane project.

Company become defunct in 2023.

== Aircraft ==
Summary of aircraft built by FlyNano
Model name	First flight	Number built	Type
FlyNano Proto	11 June 2012	3	one-seat ultralight flying boat
(unknown)	—	0 (project)	two-seat ultralight plane
(unknown)	—	0 (project)	unmanned flying boat

== Publications ==
- Bayerl, Robby; Martin Berkemeier; et al: World Directory of Leisure Aviation 2011-12, page 54. WDLA UK, Lancaster UK, 2011. ISSN 1368-485X.
- Flying device and a wing construction for the same. Inventor: Aki Suokas. U.S. patent 20140042277A1.
- Suomen sata uutta mahdollisuutta: Radikaalit teknologiset ratkaisut. Eduskunnan tulevaisuusvaliokunnan julkaisu 6/2013. Helsinki, 2013. C.93-94,97. ISBN 978-951-53-3515-9.
- 100 opportunities for Finland and the world. Radical Technology Inquirer (RTI) for anticipation/evaluation of technological breakthroughs. Committee for the Future of the Parliament of Finland. Helsinki, 2015. C.98,101-102. ISBN 978-951-53-3580-7.
- Technological change 2013–2016. Preliminary investigation: Development of radical technologies after the review in 2013. Committee for the Future of the Parliament of Finland. Helsinki, 2016. C.64. ISBN 978-951-53-3617-0.
