= Surfboard =

Platform board used in the sport of surfing

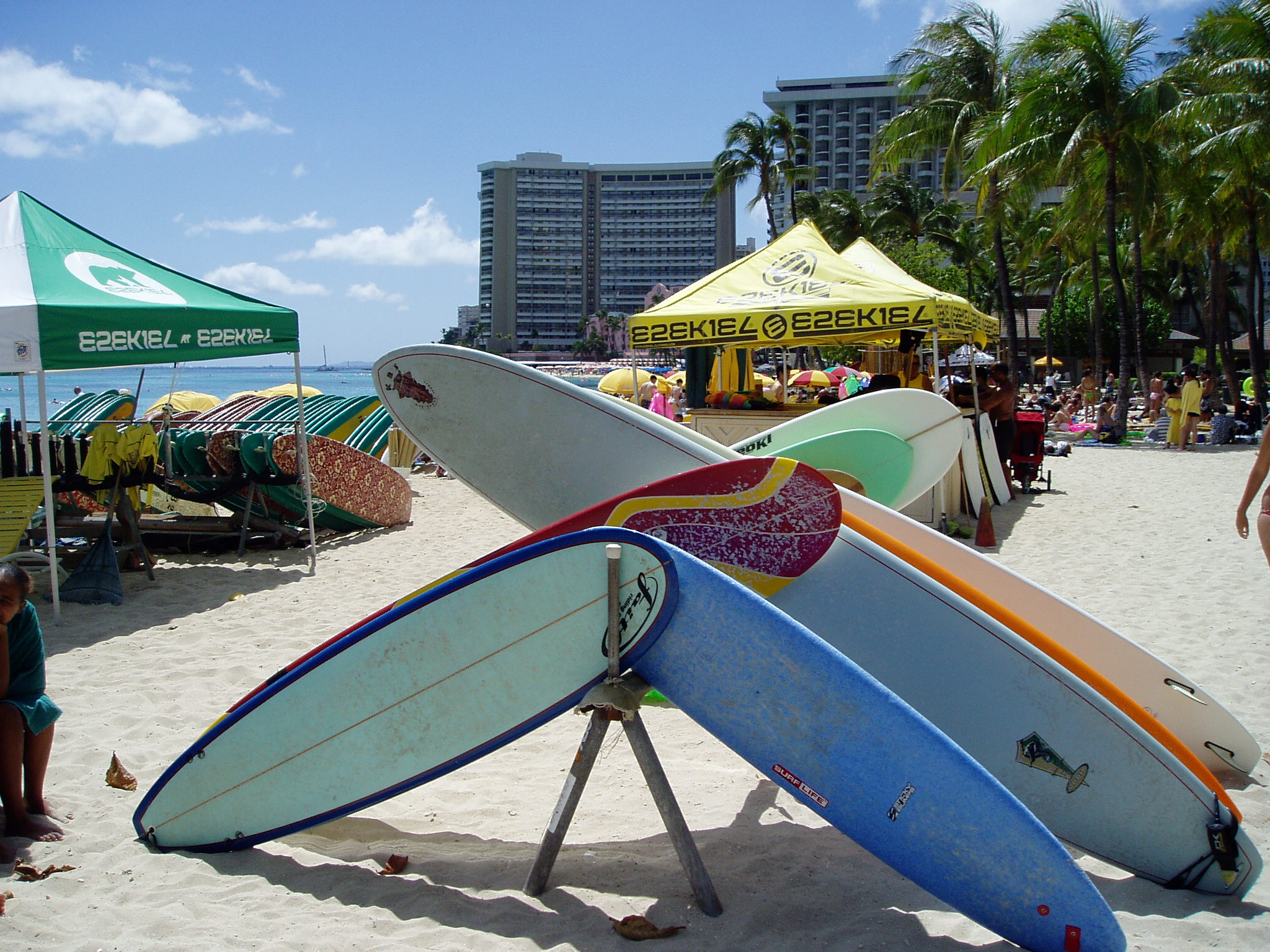
A rack of boards in Waikiki during a surf competition.

A surfboard is a narrow plank used in surfing. Surfboards are relatively light, but are strong enough to support an individual standing on them while riding an ocean wave. They were invented in ancient Hawaii (known as papa heʻe nalu in Hawaiian) and were usually made of wood from local trees, such as koa. They were often over 460 cm (15 ft) in length and extremely heavy. Major advances over the years include the addition of one or more fins (skegs) on the bottom rear of the board to improve directional stability, and numerous improvements in materials and shape.

Modern surfboards are made of polyurethane or polystyrene foam. Unlike soft top surfboards, hard top surfboards are also covered with layers of fiberglass cloth, polyester or epoxy resin. The result is a light and strong surfboard that is buoyant and maneuverable. Recent developments in surfboard technology have included the use of carbon fiber and kevlar composites, as well as experimentation in biodegradable and ecologically friendly resins made from organic sources. Each year, approximately 400,000 surfboards are manufactured.

== Sizing ==
Choice of surf board type and size can be complex. Depending, amongst other things, on:

- Skill, fitness and surfing style
- Expected wave conditions
- Body dimensions of the surfer (height and weight)

Traditionally board lengths have been sized according to the height of the surfer, meaning in general that longer boards would be recommended for taller surfers. Standard dimensions for board size has for long been the board's length, width and thickness. More recently however, the weight of the surfer has also started to be taken into account, meaning in general that a heavier surfer would be recommended a board with more volume.

== Parts ==
Diagram of a surfboard including the nose, the tail, the deck, the rails, the stringer, the bottom, the nose rocker, the tail rocker, and the leg rope

=== Bottom ===
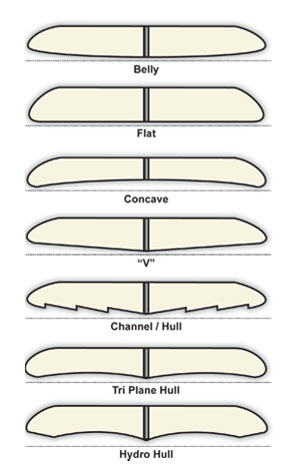
A chart showing various shapes of the bottoms of surf boards.

The surface of the board that rests on the water is usually flat or concave but sometimes convex. The bottom can also feature channels, chines, steps and other planing features shaped into the board in order to maximize, direct or alter water flow across the board's bottom surface.

==== Concave ====
Modern surfboards often contain multiple contours on the bottom of the board, termed concaves. These concaves have different uses and vary among different types of surfboards. Most concaves on the modern shortboard begin about 30 cm (12 in) back from the nose of the board on the bottom and then carry out through the middle to the tail of the surfboard. The purpose of concave is to direct water through the fins of the surfboard. Surfboard shapers sometimes experiment with concaves to create different drive and response characteristics on each individual surfboard.

==== Convex ====
Some older and more traditional surfboards along with many modern boards that take inspiration from these older boards utilize a convex rather than concave design on the bottom of the surfboard. These boards displace more water and sit lower in the wave than a surfboard with a concave bottom.

=== Deck ===
The deck is the surface of the board that the surfer stands on. Contours such as concaves (similar to the deck of a skateboard) or rail channels (to add structural rigidity) can also be shaped into the deck. Surfwax is applied to this surface. Wax comes in different degrees of hardness allowing its application in differing water temperatures. The ideal choice of wax hardness is determined by the water temperature.

=== Fins ===
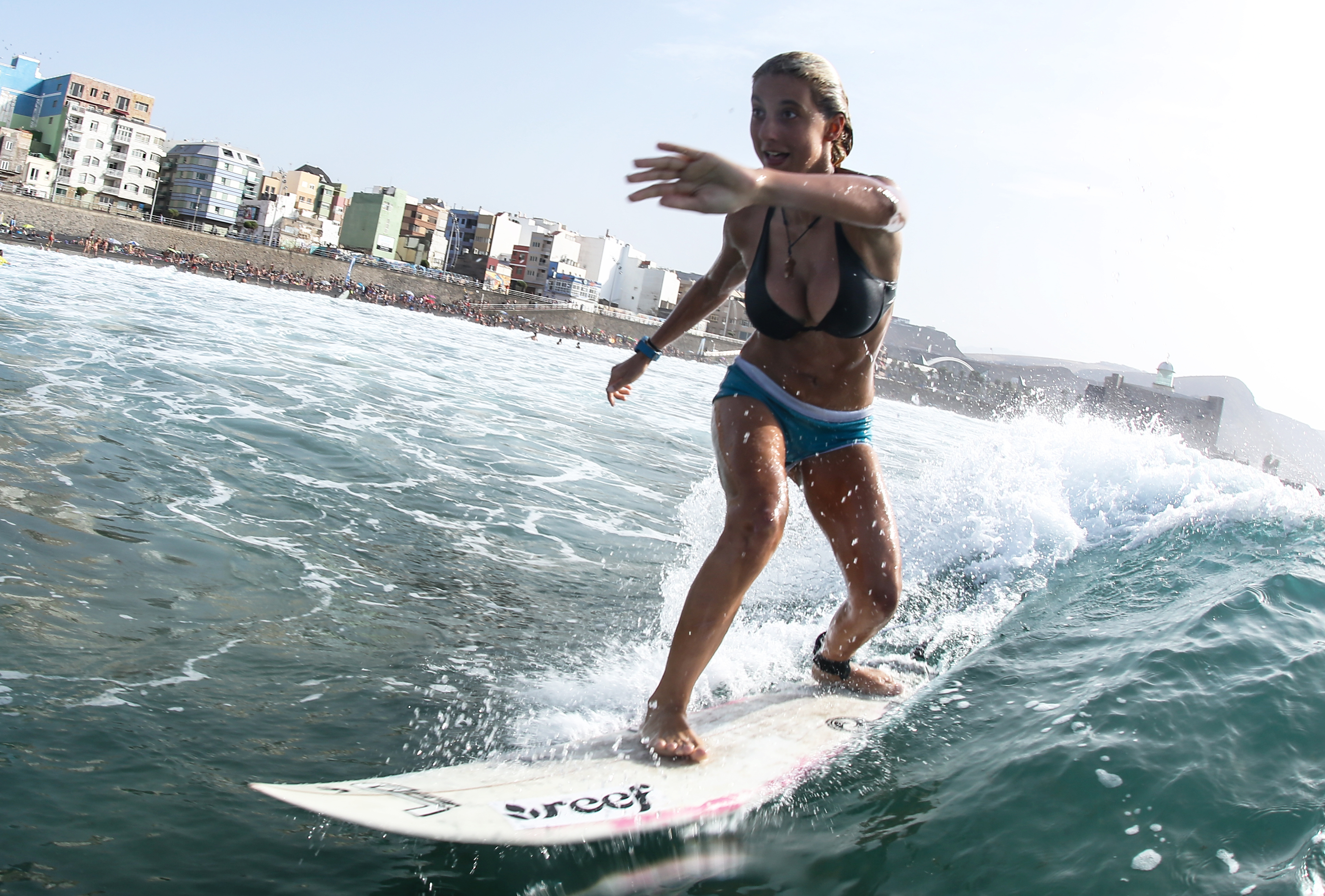
A woman standing on a board riding the wave.

The surfboard fin is a stabilizing rudder fixed to the rear of the surfboard to prevent it from sliding sideways. In the early days, surfers would stabilize the board by hanging the toes of their back foot over the edge of the board and would steer by putting their foot in the water. The American surfer Tom Blake was the first to experiment with adding a fin to a surfboard, fastening the keel from an old speedboat to a surfboard in 1935. About one or two years later, Woody "Spider" Brown independently developed a similar design, but Brown himself gave Blake precedence: "(I made my first surfboard keel) about '36 or '37, somewhere in there; about the same time. But, I didn't know anything about (Blake) and his experiments with adding fins to surfboards. See, we were all separated out. I was in San Diego and he was in L.A., way up there.". This innovation revolutionized surfing, allowing surfers to direct the board's momentum and providing more balance when turning.

The template of the modern surfboard fin was developed by George Greenough in the 1960s. The single fin changed little until the late 70s, when a second was added and popularised by Australian Mark Richards. In October 1980, after seeing a twin fin surfboard with a "trigger point" fin Simon Anderson had the idea for a new, equal size, version of the existing three fin prototypes which was later dubbed the "thruster". He created a prototype and 30 years later his "thruster" design is still the most popular fin design for surfboards.

In the early 90s removable fin systems were developed and embraced. This provides a standardized system that allows fins to be easily removed or replaced, utilizing set screws to hold the fins in place. These systems provided surfers with the ability to alter the riding characteristics of a surfboard, by changing the size and shape of fins used. This innovation opened the market to a range of fin designs, including single foiled fins, concave inside surfaces, and curved fins. Another variation of fin was later designed in the time frame known as the soul fin, a sleek bendable attachment.

Tunnel fins were invented in the 1960s by Richard Deese, and were found on longboards by multiple manufacturers of that era, including Dewey Weber. Bob Bolen, A.K.A. 'the Greek', patented the "Turbo Tunnel" in the late 1990s.

Since the mid 1990s, half tunnel fins have mainly been used on very long hollow wooden surfboards mainly surfed by Roy Stuart.

Bullet Fins were invented in the 2005 by Ron Pettibone to increase surfboard hull planing and rail-to-rail transition speed. The patent-pending fins are based on 50 years of hydrodynamic research on the bulbous bow hull design. Just as with the bow of a ship, the traditional surfboard fin creates a wave as it displaces the water in its path. The resulting turbulence places drag on the surfboard. The bulb of the Bullet Fin reduces this drag by creating a new (primary) fin wave in front of the original (secondary) wave. This new bulb wave is designed to be nearly 180 degrees out of phase with the original fin wave to subtract its turbulence thus reducing fin drag.

Winged fins are another type of surfboard fin, the genesis of which was America's Cup sailboat design. The Starfin was designed in the 1980s by the America's Cup yacht designer, Ben Lexcen, who had designed the winged keel for the America's Cup boat, Australia II. The small thruster-sized fin, the RedTip 3D is manufactured by FCS.

Fins with winglets—tiny wings—were invented in 2005. The purpose of winglets, as in airplane design, is to increase lift (horizontal turning force in the case of surfboard fins) while reducing drag, by reducing the fin-tip vortex.

Fins with a camber have an asymmetrical profile. In windsurfing camber is used to increase the lift to drag ratio of the fin and to minimise cavitation and the risk of spin-out. In particular windsurfers trying to improve speed records use camber fins, as the maximum performance is required on one down-wind course direction. As the camber is fixed to one side, performance when sailing in one direction is improved but performance in the other way is deteriorated.

Fins with self-adjusting camber offer the improved qualities in both port side and starboard side sailing directions.

Spitfire fins are based on the wing configuration used by Spitfire aeroplanes. The elliptical wing shapes work very well as surfboard fins and several manufacturers make fins with this more upright stance, as it increases drive and maneuverability.

In 2004 Frank Fish introduced the world to Whale Bumps with their Tubercle effect. Several fin manufacturers tried making some fins at that time, after the article was discussed on Swaylock's design Forum. The process of grinding bumps, which are properly foiled, into an existing fin is an arduous, time consuming task. Hand foiling tubercles can take up to 40 hours+. Roy Stuart worked on wooden prototypes for years before creating the first polycarbonate, 3d printed, whale bumped surfboard fins in 2013.

==== Thrusters and Tri-fins ====
The tri-fin's design attempts to incorporate the glide of a longboard and the performance of a shortboard into a single layout. The additional fins ensure that even what riding down the line, two, or at least one, vertical control surface is in black water (not unstable foam) allows riders better turning capabilities. In a Thruster, the symmetrically-foiled center fin is flanked by twin asymmetric, cambered fins. The camber is angled front in and top in, directing energy from the incoming wave to lift the board and straighten it, not dissimilar from the force vectoring provided by the geometry of a rocket's nozzle.

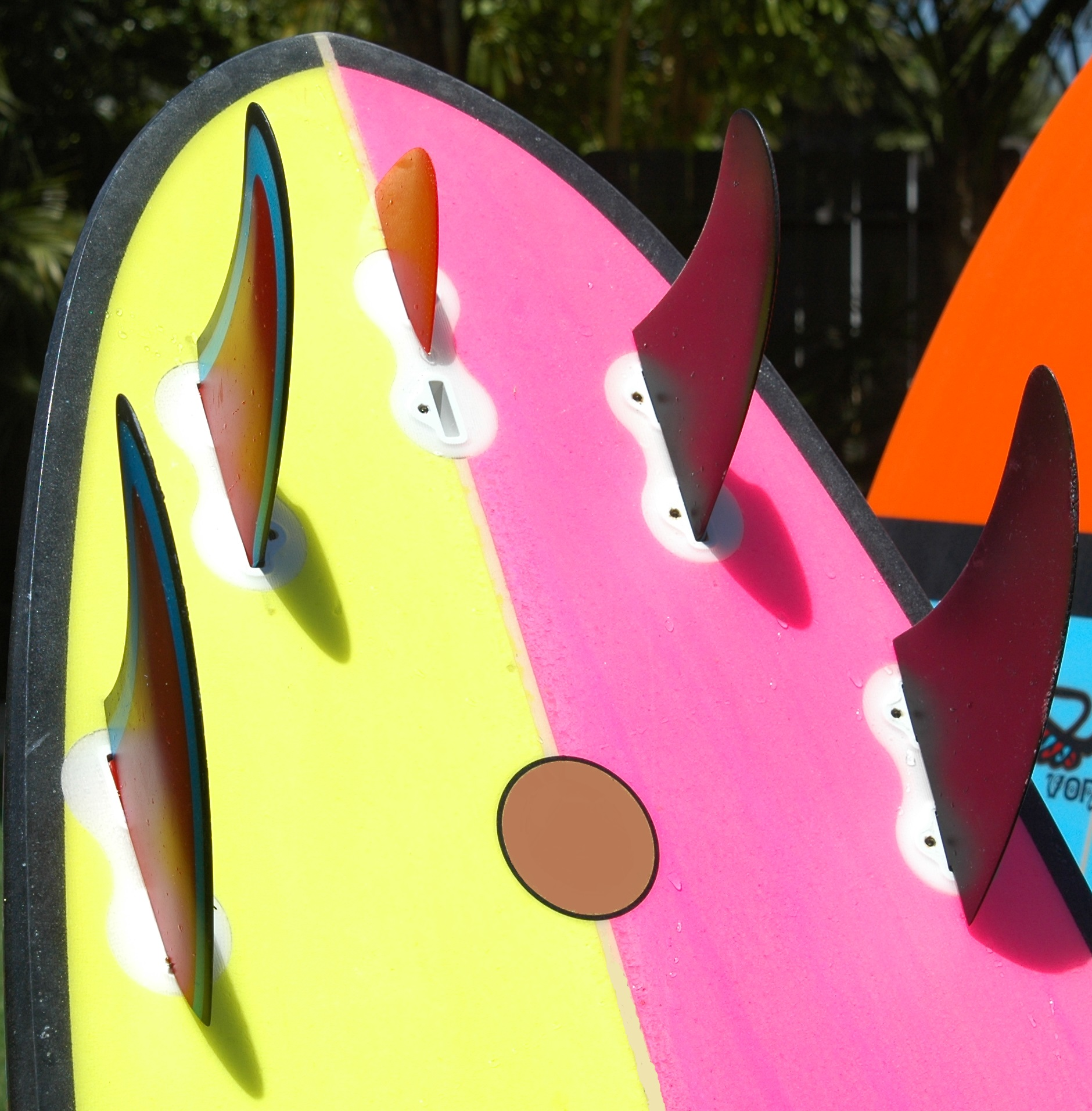
Nubster Fin Seen In Middle

==== Quad ====
A "Quad" four fins, typically arranged as two pairs of thrusters in wing formation, which are quick down the line but tend to lose energy through turns. The energy is lost as the board goes up the wave because the fins are now vectoring energy from the oncoming water toward the back of the board, bleeding speed.

==== Nubster ====
Created by professional surfer Sean Mattison as a rear stabilization fin. Dubbed a "guitar pick" the nubster was designed to be used as a fifth fin. The Nubster helped professional surfer Kelly Slater win contests in New York and Portugal in 2011.

=== Leash ===
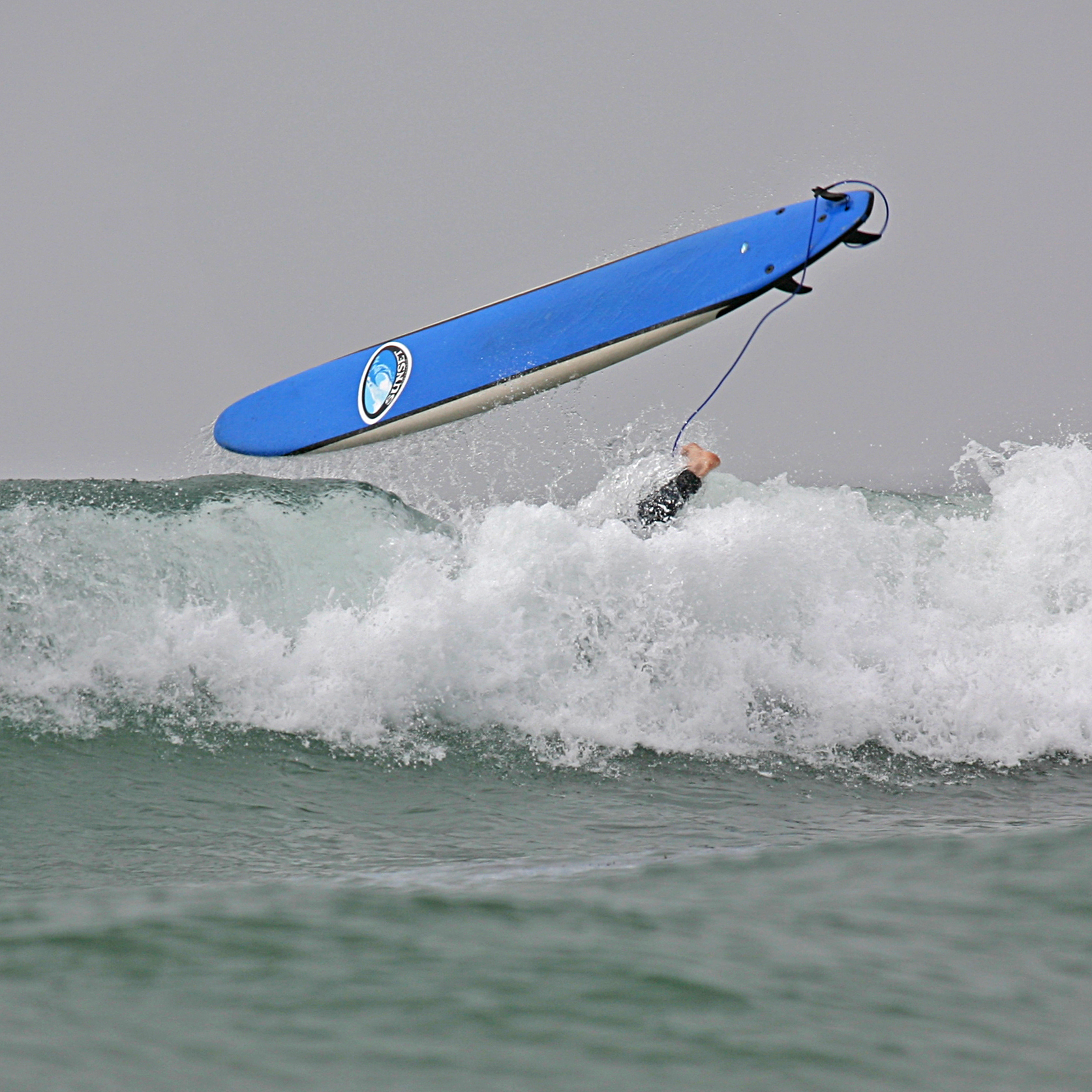
The leash attaches a surfboard to the surfer.

A surfboard leash or leg rope is the cord that attaches a surfboard to the surfer. It prevents the surfboard from being swept away by waves and stops runaway surfboards from hitting other surfers and swimmers. Modern leashes comprise a urethane cord where one end has a band with a velcro strap attached to the surfer's trailing foot, and the opposite has a velcro strap attached to the tail end of the surfboard.

Jack O'Neill lost his left eye in a surf leash accident as the surgical tubing used in the early designs allowed the leash to overstretch, causing the surfboard to fly back towards the surfer. Subsequent cords were made with less elastic materials.

=== Nose ===
The front tip of the board. This can be pointed or rounded and can be made with a steep incline ("rocker", see below) or a gentle one.

Chart of various types of surf board tails

=== Tail ===
The shape of the tail affects how a board responds. Tail shapes vary from square, pin, squash, swallow, diamond, and so on—each one in turn having its own family of smaller variants. A pin tail causes the board to move faster in the water, whereas the hip tail is created to help balance more than speed.

=== Traction Pad ===
Surfboard traction pads, deck grips, tailpads. There are several names for this piece of foam applied to the top of a surfboard to increase the grip and allow surfers to have more control and perform more high performance maneuvers. Traction pads are used on both shortboards and longboards, usually applied to the tail area of a surfboard.

Traction pads for the middle section of the deck, known as the "Mid Traction Pads" are mainly used on performance shortboards for increased grip. Unlike a tail pad - mid-deck traction pads need wax for added grip.

=== Rails ===
The edges of the board. A rounded rail is called "soft", while a more squared-off rail is called "hard", and rails that are in between are termed "50/50" ("fifty-fifty"). Larger, fuller rails contain a greater volume of foam giving the board increased buoyancy along the edge, while sharper, narrower rails have less volume, making the board easier to "sink" and "lean on edge". While riding down the line, one rail is always in the water while the other is suspended freely in the air. Turns are largely a matter of transitioning from rail to tail and over to the contralateral (opposing) rail.

=== Rocker ===
This refers to the vertical curve of the board between nose and tail. Rockers may be described as either heavy (steeply curved) or relaxed (less curved) and may be either continuous (a single curve between tip of nose and end of tail) or staged (distinct flat section in middle portion of board). The nose rocker or flip is the curve between the front tip and the middle or flattest portion of the board, and the tail rocker or kick is that between the tail and the middle/ flattest portion. An increase in flip helps keep the board from "pearling"; larger boards often require a greater flip. A larger kick adds maneuverability and lift to the tail at speed and provides tail sensitivity in critical turns. More relaxed rockers help the board to handle better on flatter sections of water, while heavy rockers increase the board's overall form drag but also give true lift when reaching planing speed and have a smaller turning radius.

The board's rails and deck may also be referred to as having rocker. A board with a v-shaped tail, for example, has had the lower/ outer portion of its rear rails reduced, increasing its tail rail rocker. Having a flat, even deck rocker will increase a board's flexibility, while a convex deck rocker creates a board that is thicker along the board's stringer and stiffer in the water.

=== Stringer ===
In board design, the "stringer" is a board's central plane of reflection, down the middle of its deck and its keel. In construction, the stringer can have no special parts, or can embed a stiff, thin, vertical slat, usually of wood but sometimes of carbon fiber, running from nose to tail. The stringer serves to increase the board's overall strength and reduce its flexibility. Some boards have multiple stringers.

== Construction ==
To achieve positive buoyancy and a stiff deck, shapers have always reached for a foam, often hardened with a tensile skin, using toucan beak engineering concepts.

Delamination is a problem where the skin of the board (i.e. fiberglass) separates from the foam core. All surfboards made of foam and resin can face the problem of delamination. A common reason for delamination is excessive heat. Delamination often first appears around dents.

Modern surfboards are usually made of foam using one of the following construction materials:

- Polyurethane (PU foam) with polyester resin have been used in surfboards since the 1950s, and is, therefore, the oldest of the modern construction methods. Many hand-shaped boards are made of PU since it is a brittle material, making it easy to form by hand using sandpaper, shortening the build time. Both PU boards made by hand or by machines are usually more affordable compared to other foam materials. Some drawbacks are the toxicity of the material, that it is non-recyclable and that the PU foam is more flexible than some alternatives, making the board less stiff so that it can bend and twist more during use. PU foam can also absorb water and yellow over time. It is also possible to build PU boards using epoxy resin. PU is still the most used material in surf board construction today.
- Polystyrene (PS foam) with epoxy resin has a lower weight, but is not as strong as the more traditional PU foam. The PS foam core is therefore enclosed with a layer of epoxy to increase strength. Within polystyrene, mainly two types are used in surfboard construction; EPS and XPS. The reason epoxy resin is used exclusively instead of polyester resin on these boards, is that the polystyrene foam reacts chemically upon contact with polyester resin, causing the PS foam to melt. EPS and XPS have the advantages that they are more environmentally friendly, can last longer and are recyclable. However, they are more time consuming to shape by hand, taking for example 2 to 4 times as long to build. Often PS boards are not as stiff as PU boards, which may be the reason most professional surfers still prefer PU.
  - Expanded polystyrene is the lightest foam material commonly used to produce surfboards today, being lighter than both PU and XPS. A drawback to EPS is that it is difficult to shape by hand, and EPS boards are therefore typically made using machines where the shaping of the foam is near completed after the molding itself. It is possible to buy such semi-finished EPS boards (known as "pop out boards") to which the buyer can add glassfiber and resin themselves. Another drawback with EPS foam is that it absorbs water more easily. EPS has a structure consisting of individually closed cells, but there are air gaps between the cells themselves where water can enter. This gives EPS a higher permeability. EPS boards typically don't delaminate easily, but should be constructed using a vent to prevent delamination due to outgassing.
  - Extruded polystyrene (XPS foam) is somewhat heavier than EPS, and usually weighs as much as PU or more. XPS has a homogenous structure consisting of several layers of continuously extruded closed cells. XPS therefore resists water absorption very well, since there are no air gaps between the beads. Depending on construction, XPS boards may however be more prone delamination due to the closed structure preventing the epoxy resin getting a good grip on the foam. Improvements in manufacturing has alleviated some of these problems. XPS boards typically don't have a vent.

Fiberglass is the most common skin regardless of foam type. Other skin materials used are bamboo, carbon fiber, hemp kevlar and innegra.

EPS and XPS boards are sometimes erroneously referred to as "epoxy boards", while PU boards sometimes are erroneously referred to as "fiberglass boards". These designations are not correct. Firstly, fiberglass is the most common skin for all the mentioned foam types. Secondly, PU foam boards can also be constructed using epoxy resin.

=== Polyurethane (PU) boards ===
Surfboards have traditionally been constructed using polyurethane foam and it remains a popular choice. They are made stronger with one or more stringers going down the middle of the board. The foam is molded into a "blank", in the rough shape of a surfboard. Once the blanks have been made they are given to shapers. Shapers then cut, plane, and sand the board to its specifications. Finally, the board is covered in one or more layers of fiberglass cloth and resin. It is during this stage that the fins or boxes for removable fins are attached and the leash plug installed. Another method of making boards is using epoxy resin and prolapse polystyrene foam, instead of polyester resin and polyurethane foam. In recent years, surfboards made out of balsa and a polystyrene core are becoming more popular. Even solid balsa surfboards are available.

Although foam boards are usually shaped by hand, the use of machines to shape them has become increasingly popular. Vacuum forming and modern sandwich construction techniques borrowed from other industries have also become common. Many surfers have switched to riding sandwich-construction epoxy boards which have become especially popular with beginner surfers as they provide a durable, inexpensive, entry-level board.

=== Balsa boards ===
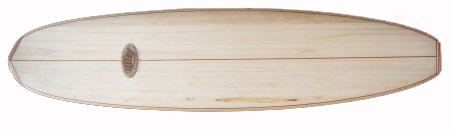
Balsa MiniMal.

The Ochroma pyramidale wood's surfboard history originates in the Hawaiians, and the wood lead surfing's landfall on the US west coast in the 1940s. Being light and strong, balsa wood was long considered a perfect material for surfboards. Shapers could not use this fragile wood to make entire surfboards until after WWII, when fiberglass skins were invented.

Balsa wood boards are lighter, more buoyant and easier to handle than other boards. These boards have some disadvantages, however: they are not as sturdy as solid redwood boards.

=== Hollow wooden boards ===
Hollow wooden surfboards are made of wood and epoxy or oil (as a sustainable alternative to epoxy), and are a reversion to using wood after the foam became dominant in the 1950s. Hollow wooden surfboards specifically have no foam in their construction. (Boards made with foam and wood are commonly known as compsands or veneer boards.) Various construction methods are used to hollow the inside of the surfboard and lighten the weight of the completed board. Generally, a hollow wood surfboard is 30% to 300% heavier than a standard foam and resin surfboard. The main inspiration, apart from beauty, is that this is a more environmentally friendly method of construction (compared to epoxy and polyurethane methods) which uses fast-growing plantation wood such as paulownia, cedar, spruce, redwood, and, of course, balsa.

The current construction methods descend from the 1930s Tom Blake paddleboarding method, which favors a central stringer with individually shaped transverse ribs covered with a skin and rails. A modern interpretation of Tom Blake's work is the perimeter stringer method used by some manufacturers, utilizing laminated rails as stringers connected with a series of plywood ribs. This skeleton is then sheathed with 5mm-thick wood strips, creating a fast hollow board with good flex properties.

The parallel profile system was developed from cold molded (double diagonal) boat building, and uses at least four layers of material laminated over a male mold into a curved blank, including enough wood for rails, which are then shaped.

The chambering method follows a system in which planks of paulownia wood are selected and the rocker of the board is cut into each. The planks are then chambered to reduce weight, and then bonded together to form a hollow or "chambered" blank.

=== CUSH - skinned surfboards ===
One of the most recent modern advancements in surfboard technology is the creation of high performance boards which are wrapped in a stretchable soft skin which does not absorb water. The internal structure of Cush (cushion) boards is an epoxy surfboard with an EPS (extruded polystyrene) shaped foam core. The "skin", made of a gloss coated foam, is stretched and adhered while vacuumed over the surface of the entire epoxy surfboard. The purpose of the cush is for dampening of chatter, absorption of impact landings, airs, grip, and overall added protection for a light epoxy board. Jim Richardson, 25-year veteran shaper on the North Shore of Oahu, first pioneered this technology in the mid 1990s. And recently a few company's including Spacestick, Radiowake and CUSH (brand) have begun to market the advancements to the surfing community. Spacestick and CUSH surfboards are the current manufacturer for the various brands as of 2018.

=== Composite Sandwich Construction ===
The Composite Sandwich type of board construction became popular among garage shapers and later, major manufacturers, during the 1990s and 2000s. This construction method entails hand- or machine-shaping a foam blank from EPS foam and then vacuum-bagging or hand-laminating a more dense layer of foam, wood, or carbon onto the bottom and deck of the EPS foam core, usually separating the two layers with lightweight fiberglass cloth (2 oz pr. sq.yd, or 70 g/m^{2}) or other composites cloths. This can also be accompanied with parabolic rails made of balsa or other buoyant woods, carbon, or other high-density materials. This blank construction is then laminated with epoxy resin and fiberglass or other composite cloth as any other surfboard would be, by hand or via vacuum bag.

The construction is referred to as a sandwich as it consists of the top skin, fiberglass or other composite cloth, the EPS core, fiberglass or other composite cloth, and the bottom skin, the cross section of which appears as a sandwich with the different layers. Firewire Surfboards pioneered this technology for the mass-produced surfboard market beginning in 2006.

Soft skin construction, such as Cush or Spacestick boards, adds an additional soft shell skin to the outside of a sandwich construction board. The soft skin is vacuumed to the cloth and epoxy so that the soft shell is exposed--- meaning the hard glass and resin are protected inside, and under, the soft cush skin.

== Board types and variations ==
=== Shortboard ===
Since the late 1960s when Gordon Clark found the optimum formulation of urethane foam, many of the surfboards in common use have been of the shortboard variety between 180 and 210 cm (6 and 7 ft) in length with a pointed nose and a rounded or squarish tail, typically with three "skegs" (fins) but sometimes with two or as many as five. Surfers generally find a shortboard quick to maneuver compared with other types of surfboards, but because of a lack of flotation due to the smaller size, the shortboard is harder to catch waves with, often requiring steeper, larger and more powerful waves and very late takeoffs, where the surfer catches the wave at the critical moment before it breaks.

A Bonzer is a surfboard designed by the Campbell Brothers that can have three or five fins and is punctuated with a large center fin and two to four smaller side fins (side bites). This, combined with deep double concave channels creates a distinctive board. The manufacturer has shown that these channels create versatile and controlled characteristics using the venturi effect which guides the water off of the surface of the board through a narrowed passage.

==== Hybrid ====
Modern hybrid boards are usually 180 to 260 cm (6 to 8.5 ft) in length with a more rounded profile and tail shape. Hybrid boards are usually used in smaller waves and can have any fin set up. They are more about having fun than high performance or tricks. They can be easier to ride for beginning surfers and generally perform well in surfing conditions where the more traditional long and short boards might not.

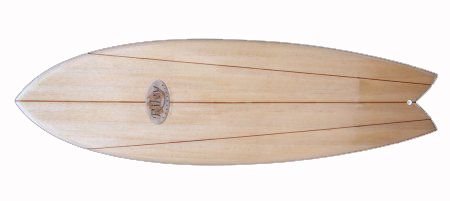
Balsa Fish.

==== Fish ====
Usually a short stubby board under 180 cm (6 ft) in length developed from kneeboards in 1967 by Steve Lis. Other prominent fish shapers include Skip Frye, Larry Mabile and Steve Brom. Primarily a twin fin set up with a swallow tail shape and popular in smaller waves, the fish enjoyed a resurgence in popularity in the early 2000s after legendary surfer Tom Curren rode one during an ASP event at Hossegor. Note, any type of board (such as shortboard or mini-longboard) can have a fish tail, and these are commonly referred to as a "fish", but they lack the other properties of a traditional, or "retro" fish as described here.

==== Mid length ====
A mid length surfboard is generally 177cm to 200cm (7' to 8') in length with a slightly more performance-focused shape than the similar-sized normal board. Narrow outline & thruster-fin set-up make it a close companion in size and performance to a round-outline single-fin mini mal. Mid length surfboards perform well in both small and weak & large mushy waves by light and heavy surfers. A mid length is a versatile 'all-around' board

==== Funboard ====
The funboard combines elements of both shortboards and longboards and are generally midsized, usually have a length of 210 to 240 cm (7 to 8 ft), thickness of 6 to 8 cm (2.5 to 3 in) and width of 53 to 56 cm (21 to 22 in). The funboard's design allows waves to be caught more easily than a shortboard, yet with a shape that makes it more maneuverable than a longboard; hence it is a popular type of surfboard, especially among beginners or those transitioning from longboarding to the more difficult shortboarding. It is considered a good combination of the speed of a longboard and the maneuverability of a shortboard.

==== Gun ====
Big wave boards of length 210 to 370 cm (7 to 12 ft) are considered guns. These have a thin, almost needle-like profile with single, quad, or thruster fin set up. It has the appearance of a shortboard but at a longboard size. Guns are often used at big wave locations such as Waimea Bay, Jaws (Hawaii), and Mavericks.

=== Longboard ===
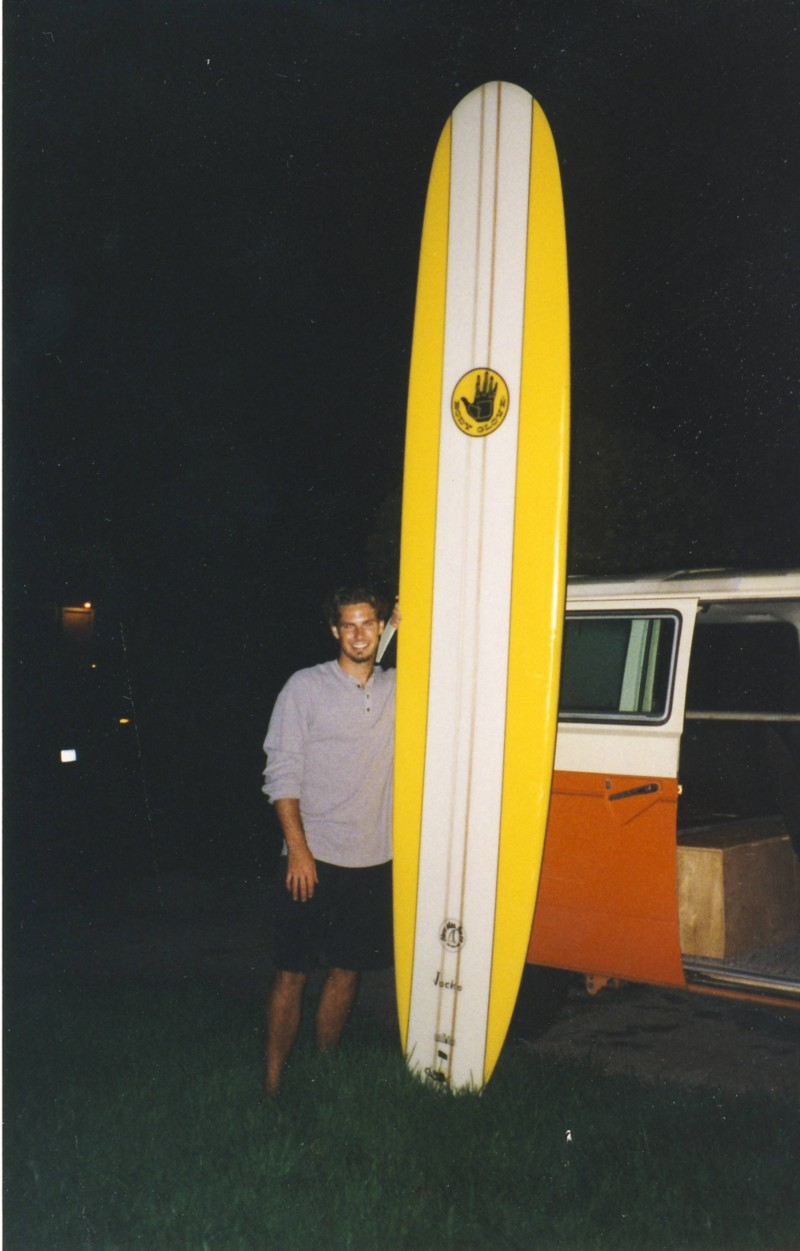
A 335 cm (11 ft) longboard.

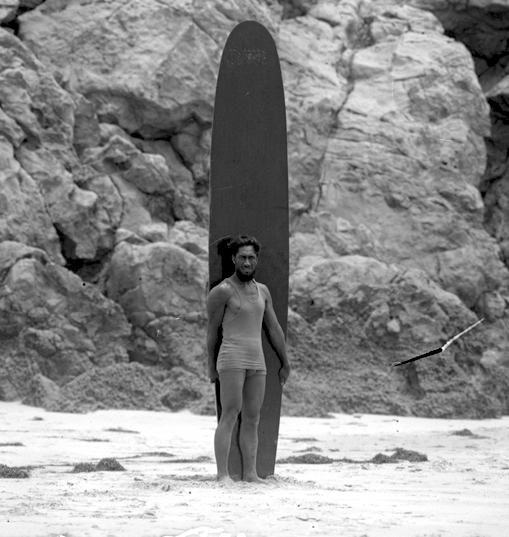
Duke Kahanamoku and longboard, 1920

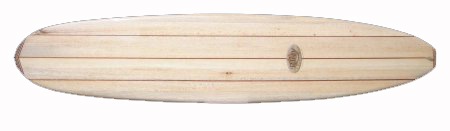
Balsa Longboard.

The longboard is primarily a single-finned surfboard with large rounded nose and length of 270 to 370 cm (9 to 12 ft). Noseriders are a class of longboards that enable the rider to walk to the tip and nose ride. These are also called "Mals", a shortened form of "Malibu boards". They range from 270 to 430 cm (9 to 14 ft) long, or 90 cm (3 ft) taller than the rider in overall length. The advantage of a longboard is its substantial buoyancy and planing surface enable surfers to ride waves generally deemed too small to propel a shortboard. Longboards are more suitable for beginners because of the board's size and ease of catching waves. In the proper conditions, a skilled surfer can ride a wave standing on the nose of a longboard with their toes over the nose's edge: in this way, with the "toes on the nose", the surfer can "hang ten". Compared to the shortboards, longboards are considerably easier to learn on as they are capable of achieving stability, thus making the transition quite difficult.

==== Classic longboards ====
Longboards are the original and very first variety of board used in standup surfing. Ever since the sixth-century CE the ancient Hawaiians have used 270 to 910 cm (9 to 30 ft) solid wooden boards when practicing their ancient art of Hoe he'e nalu. Surfing was brought to the Hawaiian Islands by Polynesians and has since become popular worldwide. The ancient boards were carved and fashioned out of solid wood, reaching lengths of 300 to 430 cm (10 to 14 ft) long and weighing as much as 70 kg. Both men and women, royalty and commoners surfed. But the longest of boards (the Olo) was reserved for royalty. During the 19th century, some extreme western missionaries actively discouraged surfing, viewing it as sinful. Surfing almost died out completely. In recent times replicas have been made of Olo's and alaia's by experienced surfers and shapers wishing to explore the roots of the sport.

By the early 20th century, only a handful of people surfed, mostly at Waikiki. But there, it started to grow again. Beginning in 1912, Duke Kahanamoku, a Hawaiian Olympic swimmer in the early 1900s, brought surfing to mainland United States and Australia. Because of this, Duke is considered the "Father of Modern Surfing". From that point on, surfing became an integral part of the California beach lifestyle. In Malibu (in Los Angeles county), the beach was so popular amongst the early surfers that it lent its name to the type of longboard, the Malibu Surfboard. In the 1920s boards made of plywood or planking called Hollowboards came into use. These were typically 460 to 610 cm (15 to 20 ft) in length and very light. During the 1950s, the surf trend took off dramatically as it obtained a substantial amount of popularity as a sport. The design and material of longboards in the 1950s changed from using solid wood to balsa wood. The length of the boards still remained the same at an average of 320 cm (10.5 ft), and had then become widely produced. It was not until the late 1950s and early 1960s when the surfboard design had closely evolved into today's modern longboard. The introduction of polyurethane foam and fiberglass became the technological leap in design. In the 1960s, the longboard continued to remain popular as its material changed from balsa wood to fiberglass and polyurethane foam.

In the 1960s, the introduction of the shortboard, averaging 200 cm (6 ft 6 in), allowed surfers to make tighter turns, quicker maneuvers, and achieve faster speeds, thus radically changing the way people surfed. This "shortboard revolution" nearly made longboards obsolete for all practical purposes. But in the early 1990s, the longboard returned, integrating a number of the design features invented during the shortboard revolution. Surfers rediscovered the grace and poise – the "glide" – of the longboard, and the fun of classic maneuvers that are not possible on a shortboard. In some circles, the battle between longboards and shortboards continues. But many surfers live by a philosophy of finding the joy of surfing a mix of boards and surfing styles to suit the waves of the day.

==== Modern longboards ====
The modern longboard has undergone many changes since its earlier models in the past. Today's longboard is much lighter than its predecessors. Its polyurethane foam and fiberglass design allows less drag on waves. Today's longboards are typically 240 to 300 cm (8 to 10 ft) long, although some ride boards up to 370 cm (12 ft) in length. Additionally, there is a revival of stand-up paddle-based surfing with boards up to 430 cm (14 ft) in length (for stability). The classic single-fin longboard retains much of its classic design including a single fin, weight, and considerable buoyancy. A longboard with a single fin allows the board to pivot turn in order to remain in the curl of the wave. Due to recent advances in technology, the longboard has expanded its family into different variations of the classic longboard.

==== The 2+1 ====
The 2+1 longboard is the most versatile board of the longboard family, offering greater maneuverability. Sometimes referred as a "single-fin with training wheels", the 2+1's fins actually takes the features of the classic longboard and the Tri-fin. The fins of the 2+1 take the rigid stability of a classic longboard, and fuses with the strength and drive of a Tri-fin.

==== Mini Tanker ====
The mini tanker is basically a shortened longboard shape that utilizes the same longboard design elements and enhanced maneuverability due to the shorter shape. These boards are normally ridden by those wanting the feel of a longboard with the increased agility of a short board .

==== The Malibu ====
Named after Malibu, California, this racy longboard shape is a little narrower than most, with slightly pulled in nose and tail sections for extra maneuverability on Malibu's famous right hand point breaks. This classic shape has been ridden and praised by experienced surfers for its maneuverability and performance. Classic tricks that can be performed on a Malibu are "Hang Fives" and "Hang tens" whereby the surfer walks to the nose of the board and hangs 5 or 10 toes over the nose, the "soul arch", drop knee turns, head dips, switch stance maneuvers, and so on.

==== Olo ====
Originally reserved for Hawaiian royalty due to its size and weight, these wooden boards can exceed lengths of 730 cm (24 ft) and reach weights up to 90 kg.

==== Alaia ====
A traditional finless wooden surfboard, typically ridden by ancient native Hawaiians, not of royal descent. The surfboard typically runs 520 cm (17 ft) 90 kg.

However modern day Alaias can be much thinner. Many are a mere 2 cm (3/4 in) thick, and can be as short as 180 cm (6 ft). Common woods used in current construction are paulownia, cedar, and other woods suitable for salty ocean waters. The tails come in different styles. The boards are notoriously difficult to ride.

==== Tandem ====
The first stand up surfboard ridden in Australia by Duke Kahanamoku and Isabel Letham is an oversized longboard with enough buoyancy to support two people, tandem surfing.

== See also ==
- Foilboard – Surfboard with a downward-extending hydrofoil
- Hamboards
- Longboarding
- Skateboard
- Snowboard
- Surf culture
- Surfboard lock
- Wind surfing
