= Woody Brown (surfer) =

American watercraft designer (1912–2008)

Woodbridge "Woody" Parker Brown (1912–2008) was an American surfer and watercraft designer best known for inventing the modern catamaran. He was also instrumental in promoting the growth of surfing in the mainland United States; among his accomplishment in surfboard shaping was an early fin design.

== Early life ==
Woodbridge Brown was born into a wealthy family of Wall Street brokers on January 5, 1912, in New York City. By the time of the Wall Street Crash of 1929 he had rejected the trappings of this life, though still benefited from its connections. At this time, he had moved out of the family home and was sleeping on hangar floors, helping with chores with early aviators such as Charles Lindbergh, whom he waved off on his historic 1927 flight to Paris.

Yeah, I met him out there at the field. I helped him with his airplane before he took off for Paris. He was my hero.

== Aviation ==
Inspired by Lindbergh, he bought a glider for $25 and towed it to California with his new four-year-old stepdaughter Jenny and wife Betty Sellon, a widowed daughter of a retired army officer with a distaste for the glitz of the "gilded age", whom he'd met at a society party he'd been persuaded to attend. For the next 5 years he was an active member of a small group of pioneering gliders. He survived some spectacular crashes. He once stated, "I died two or three times already, you know."

Brown was the first to launch a glider off the cliffs at La Jolla and in 1939 set a new world record for altitude, distance, and time aloft by flying his glider, Thunderbird, 263 miles from Texas to Kansas. He received a telegram of congratulations from President Herbert Hoover.

== Surfing ==
Brown began body-surfing in California on a carved wooden plank, using it in a style now known as boogie-boarding. Realising that if he could stand up he could catch waves before they broke, he used glider construction techniques to build his first hollow plywood surfboard in 1936, a forerunner of modern boards.

I started surfing right away. I first made these solid redwood planks, you know. You'd stand in the shallow water and shove off just like a Boogie board. But, then I began to go, 'Gee, man, if you could just have a board that would hold you up; instead of, like, solid planks ... then I could catch 'em before they're breaking. This way, I'm just catching white water.' I thought, 'Gee, then you could catch 'em way out there and ride 'em all the way in.' So, that's when I made the hollow little plywood box. About 9 feet long and about 4 inches thick [and 22 inches wide]. It was great. I could paddle out there and catch the waves and ride.

...

Thinking back on how [his] second "plywood box" responded in the surf, Woody exclaimed, "It was just like these modern kids' boards, now! I'm amazed, you know. Don Okey wrote to me from California and said, 'You know, Woody, that old board you had, it was a wonderful board. It was so good, I feel we should make a duplicate because I think it was a forerunner of the boards, today.' He said, 'I'm gonna make another one.' He asked me for the drawings. I sent him what I could remember and he built one. When I went over there [in 1993], he had one built! Exactly the same. And I rode it! And, you know, it was just like these boards, today. You don't have to use your foot ["In the old days, you had to put your foot in the water in order to turn."], you just lean and turn it like that! And, boards in those days, aw, you couldn't do that. It rode really good! And, yet, that was way back in '36! Amazing, just amazing."

For more maneuverability, he added a skeg, or small keel, a breakthrough independently developed by another legendary American surfer, Tom Blake, a year or two earlier. Brown was happy to give Blake credit:

(I made my first surfboard keel) about '36 or '37, somewhere in there; about the same time. But, I didn't know anything about [Blake] and his experiments with adding fins to surfboards. See, we were all separated out. I was in San Diego and he was in L.A., way up there."

== Death, WWII, and more surfing ==
His wife Betty died giving birth to a son, Jeffrey, in 1940. Brown suffered a breakdown: "She was all I lived for. I cracked up." Depressed and near-suicidal, he left the baby Jeffrey and stepdaughter Jenny with Betty's family and moved to Hawaii, not making contact again until they were grown up due to his remorse and guilt.

I left my car, the garage, my home, glider, everything. I don't know what happened to them. I just walked out and left everything. When you're off your rocker that way, you know, you don't know what you're doing.

He had intended to move to Tahiti, but World War II's intervention prevented him getting a visa so he was forced to stay in Hawaii. Brown was a conscientious objector during the war and became a vegetarian during his youth after he had wounded a chipmunk with a shotgun.

He joined half a dozen other surfers who collectively became known as the Hot Curl surfers, named after a new type of board they carved, semi-hollow, with a V-tail to avoid what they called "slide-ass" and help them stick to the "hot curl", the breaking curve of a wave.

Brown was one of Hawaii's first big wave surfers and board designers. He was nicknamed "Spider" because, as he put it, "I surf with my arms all out, half squatting down, and with my long legs I look like a big spider riding a board." He was captured in a 1953 photograph by Thomas Tsuzuki which helped turn Hawaii into a mecca for surfers worldwide. It showed three men riding a 20-foot wave, the kind rarely if ever photographed close-up in those days. Brown was the only one who "made" the wave.

George Downing, who along with Buzzy Trent, was also on the 20-foot wave, recalled the ride yesterday. "(Brown) was the only one that made the wave. That was point break at Makaha," said Downing. "Where Woody was he was on the perfect place on the wave."

A surfing spot in Lahaina is nicknamed after him. As recalled by Drew Kampion, surf historian of Washington state and former "Surfing" magazine editor:

[I] surfed with him in 2000 out in Lahaina at a place nicknamed after him, Woody's. He was 88 at the time, and he surfed better than I did.

== Modern ocean-going catamaran ==
After the war, Brown served as a United States government surveyor on Christmas Island. There he was fascinated by the speed of the Polynesian natives' twin-hulled outrigger canoes. Upon his return to Hawaii he adapted the idea, using lightweight hulls and adding huge sails. In 1947 he designed the Manu Kai ("Sea Bird"), which was built by the Hawaiian Alfred Kumalai, and Rudy Choy. It was probably the fastest sailing boat the world at the time and now seen as the first modern, ocean-going catamaran.

== Later life ==
Brown, having benefited from the Hawaiians' aloha spirit of generosity when he first arrived, became the epitome of that spirit in later life and was renowned for sharing "life's positive energy" with whomever he met.

He met and married his second wife, Rachel, a hula dancer, in the mid-1940s, and had two children with her: William and Mary-Sue. Rachel died in 1986 and the following year, "feeling lonesome", he married Macrene Canaveral, whom he met in the Philippines on a trip specifically "to get me a new wife". Their son, Woody Jr., was born when Brown was 76.

Brown never sought fame or recognition. Nevertheless, he featured in two U.S. documentaries, Surfing for Life (1999) and Of Wind and Waves: the Life of Woody Brown (2006), both made by the mainland American David L. Brown (no relation). It was during the filming of the latter that he was reunited with Jeffrey and Jenny.

He said of the surf in Hawaii: "I loved to get just as close to death as I possibly could and then dodge it. That was my thrill in life."

Brown died on April 16, 2008, at Hale Makua, Kahului.
