= Bruce Jones (surfboards) =

American sports executive

Bruce Jones was a founding pioneer in the surfboard shaping industry.

The company he founded, Bruce Jones Surfboards, has built premium surfboards since 1973.

Jones developed his skills by working with industry pioneers Hobart Alter founder of Hobie, Gordon Duane founder of Gordie Surfboards, and Dick Brewer founder of Dick Brewer Surfboards. Jones still shaped all of his company's boards until his death.

== Early years ==
Bruce Jones began surfing at the age of 15, and his love for the sport and interest in the art of building boards led him to pursue this as a career.

Jones started in the gluing room for Hobie Surfboards.

As the gluing room was right next to the shaping room, he had exposure to the finest shapers in the world at that time. Among them were Terry Martin, Ralph Parker, Dale Velzy and the legendary Phil Edwards. With some careful screening from Edwards, it was not long before Jones moved into shaping full-time.

== More experience ==
In the mid to late 1960s, Jones moved to Huntington Beach, California, where he shaped for Vardeman Surfboards. After learning shaping techniques from Gordon Duane of Gordie Surfboards and briefly ghost shaping for Dick Brewer on Maui in 1969, Jones eventually ended up in Sunset Beach, California, from where he launched his own business.

Also during this time (1970) Jones received a bachelor's degree in economics from California State University, Long Beach.

== Bruce Jones Surfboards ==
He opened Bruce Jones Surfboards on September 15, 1973. In 1974, he moved the shaping and manufacturing portion of his business to Costa Mesa, California. In the mid-1980s, Jones demolished the old shop and built the new store, which officially opened January 1, 1986.

== Death ==
Jones died on January 13, 2014, of a heart attack at the age of 68. A paddle-out ceremony (friends and family sitting on surfboards in the ocean holding hands as a tribute) was held March 9, 2014.
