= Hobie 18 =

Sailboat class

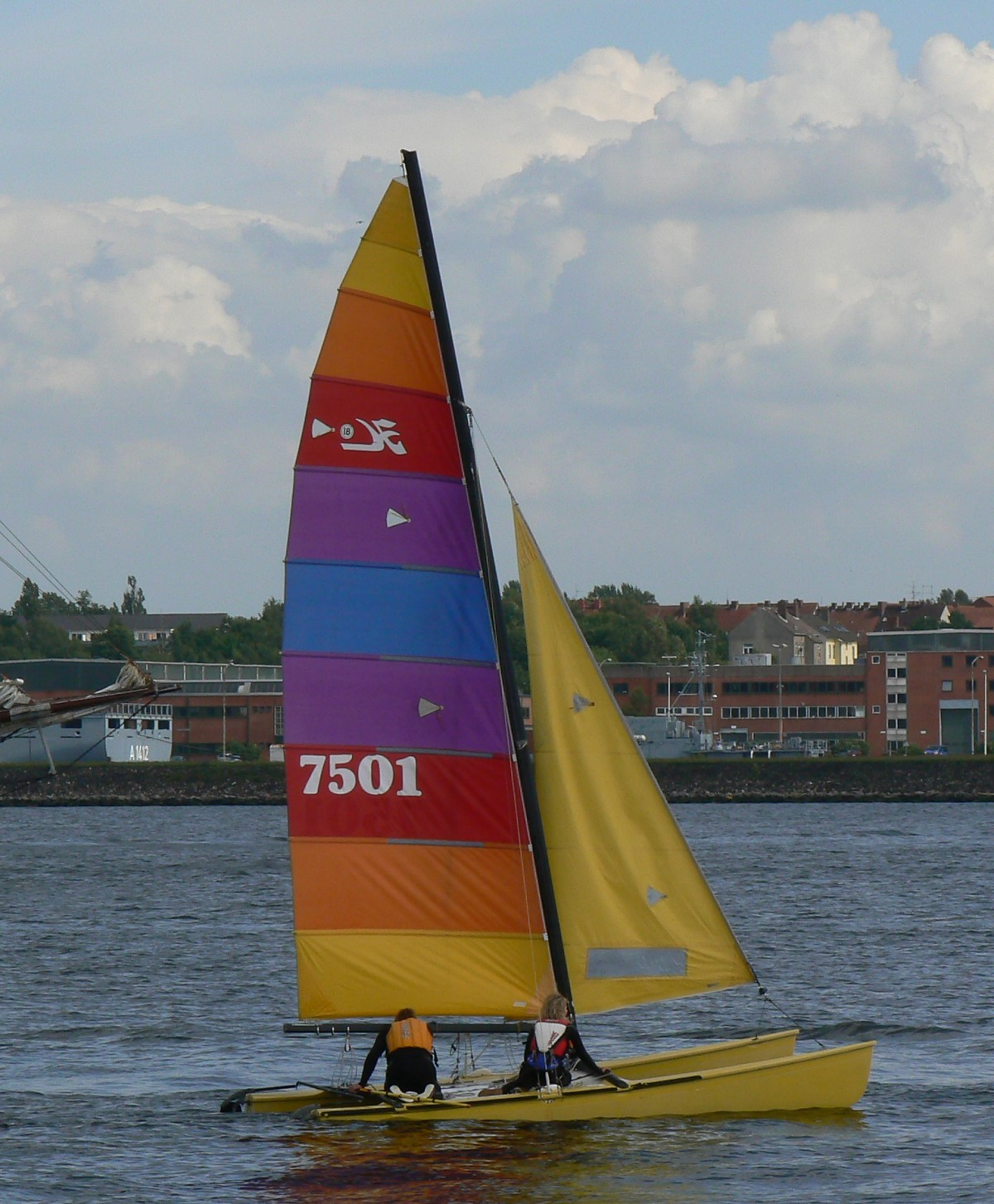

Development
- Designer: Hobie Alter and Phil Edwards
- Location: United States
- Year: 1976
- Builder: Hobie Cat
- Role: Sailing dinghy One-design racer

Boat
- Crew: two
- Displacement: 400 lb (181 kg)
- Draft: 2.50 ft (0.76 m) with a daggerboard down

Hull
- Type: catamaran
- Construction: fiberglass
- LOA: 18.00 ft (5.49 m)
- Beam: 8.00 ft (2.44 m)

Hull appendages
- Keel: twin daggerboards
- Rudder: twin transom-mounted rudders

Rig
- Rig type: Bermuda rig

Sails
- Sailplan: fractional rigged sloop
- Total sail area: 240.00 sq ft (22.297 m^{2})

The Hobie 18 is an American catamaran sailboat that was designed by Hobie Alter and Phil Edwards as a one design racer and first built in 1976.

== Production ==
The design was built by Hobie Cat in the United States, starting in 1976, but it is now out of production.

== Design ==
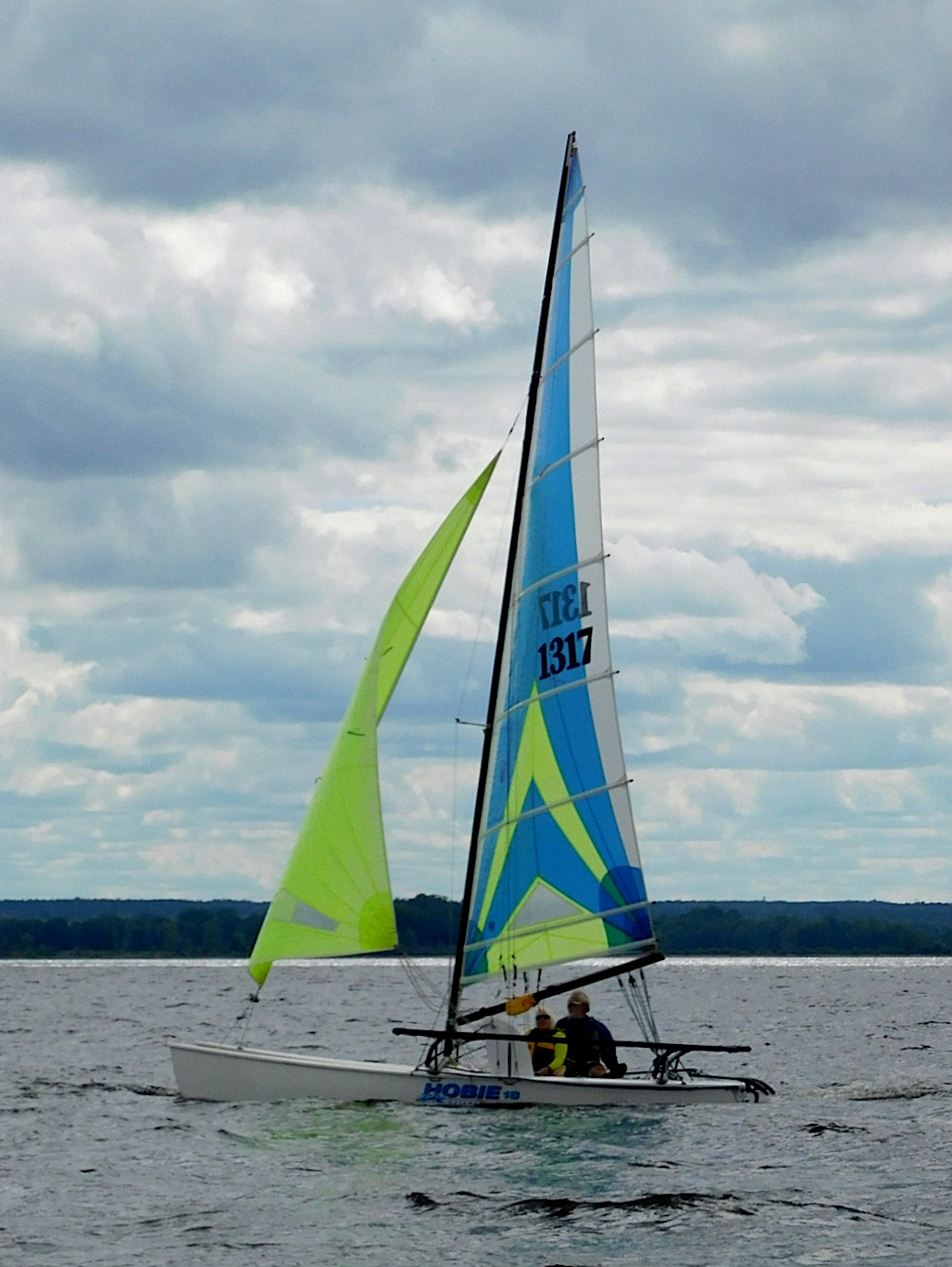
Hobie 18 Magnum

The Hobie 18 is a sailing dinghy, built predominantly of fiberglass. It has a fractional sloop rig, The twin hulls have raked stems, near-plumb transoms, twin transom-hung rudders controlled by a single tiller and twin retractable daggerboards. It displaces 400 lb (181 kg).

The design has a roller furling jib, internally-mounted halyards and adjustable mast spreaders to allow mast adjustments fore-and-aft and abeam while sailing.

The boat has a draft of 2.50 ft (0.76 m) with a daggerboard extended and 7 in (18 cm) with both retracted, allowing operation in shallow water, beaching or ground transportation on a trailer.

The Hobie 18 Magnum version has hiking wing racks that give a beam of 12 ft (3.7 m) to allow trapezing crew members more leverage in keeping the boat level.

== Operational history ==
In 1980 America's Cup racer and media mogul Ted Turner was racing the Hobie 18 and said, "it's a terrific boat, why didn't they have these when I was growing up!"

== See also ==
- List of multihulls
- List of sailing boat types
