= Hobie Bravo =

Sailboat class

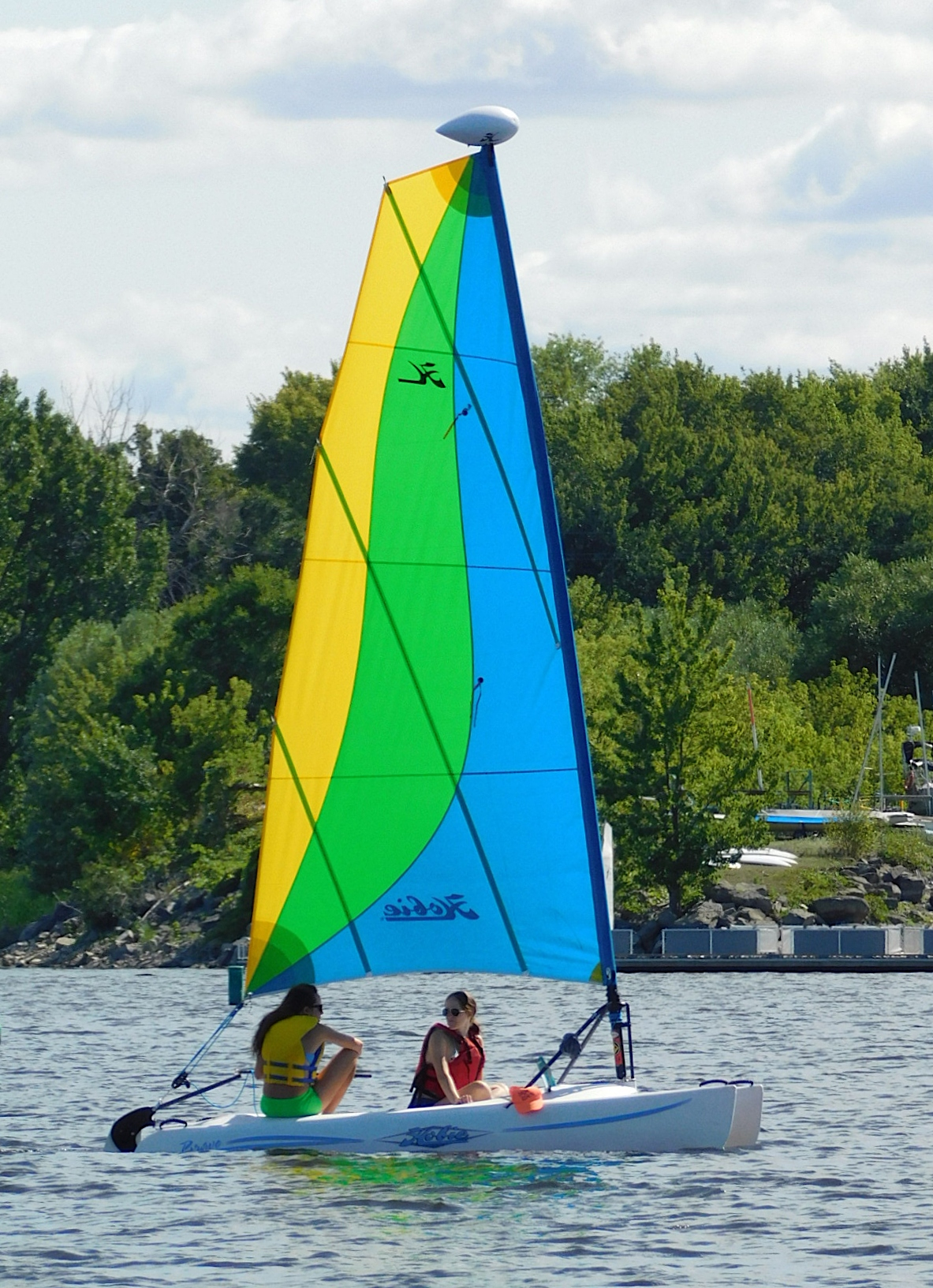

Development
- Designer: Hobie Cat
- Location: United States
- Year: 2000
- Builder: Hobie Cat
- Name: Hobie Bravo

Boat
- Displacement: 195 lb (88 kg)
- Draft: 0.50 ft (0.15 m)

Hull
- Type: Monohull
- Construction: Rotomolded polyethylene
- LOA: 12.00 ft (3.66 m)
- Beam: 4.42 ft (1.35 m)
- Engine: none

Hull appendages
- Keel: none
- Rudder: single skeg-mounted rudder

Rig
- Rig type: Cat rig

Sails
- Sailplan: Cat boat
- Mainsail area: 87 sq ft (8.1 m^{2})
- Total sail area: 87 sq ft (8.1 m^{2})

The Hobie Bravo is an American catamaran sailing dinghy that was designed by Hobie Cat in 2000 and first built in 2001. The design is intended for sailing from beaches by one or two people.

== Production ==
The design has built by Hobie Cat in the United States since 2001 and remained in production in 2019.

== Design ==
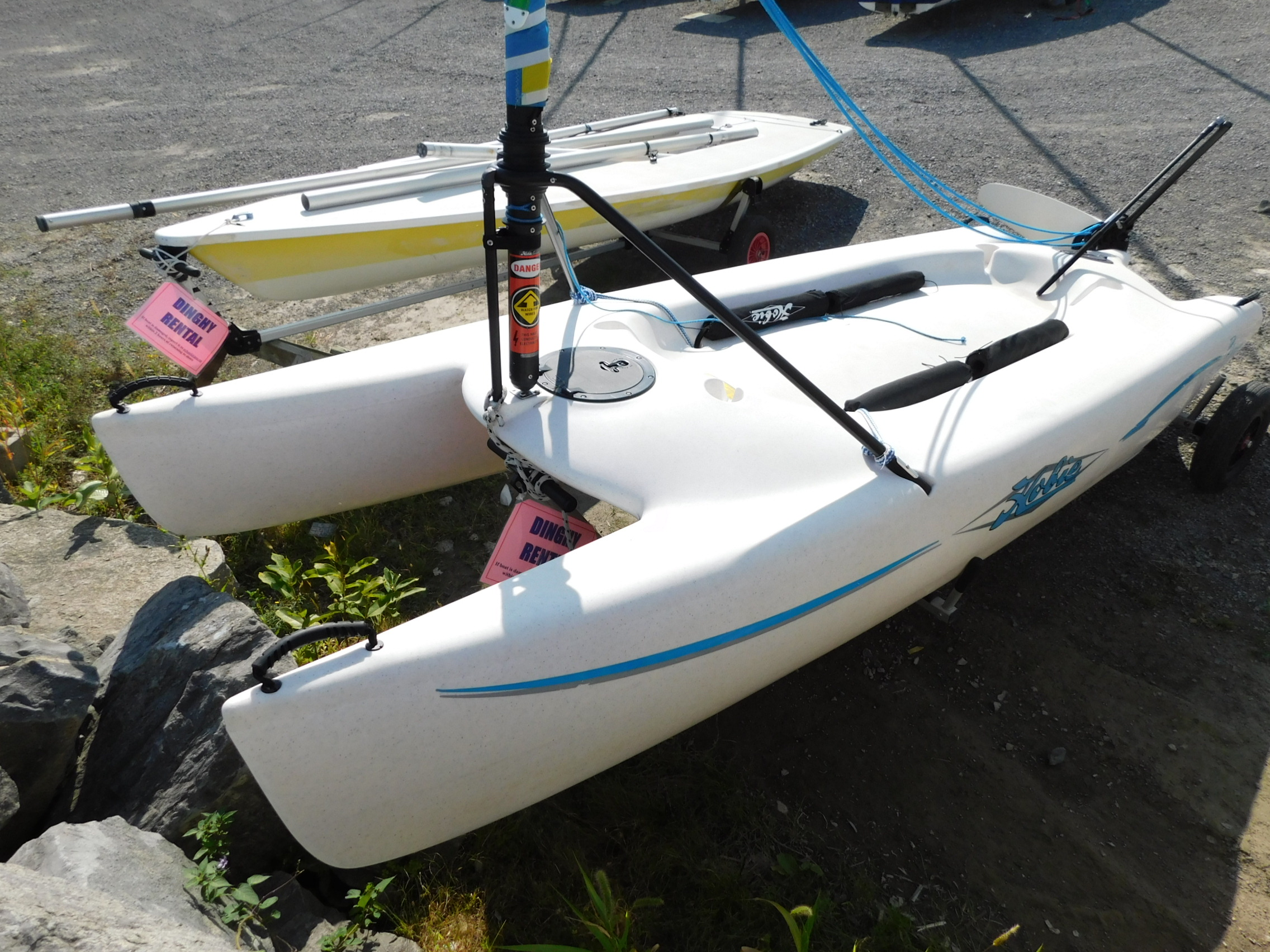
Hobie Bravo hull on a launch dolly

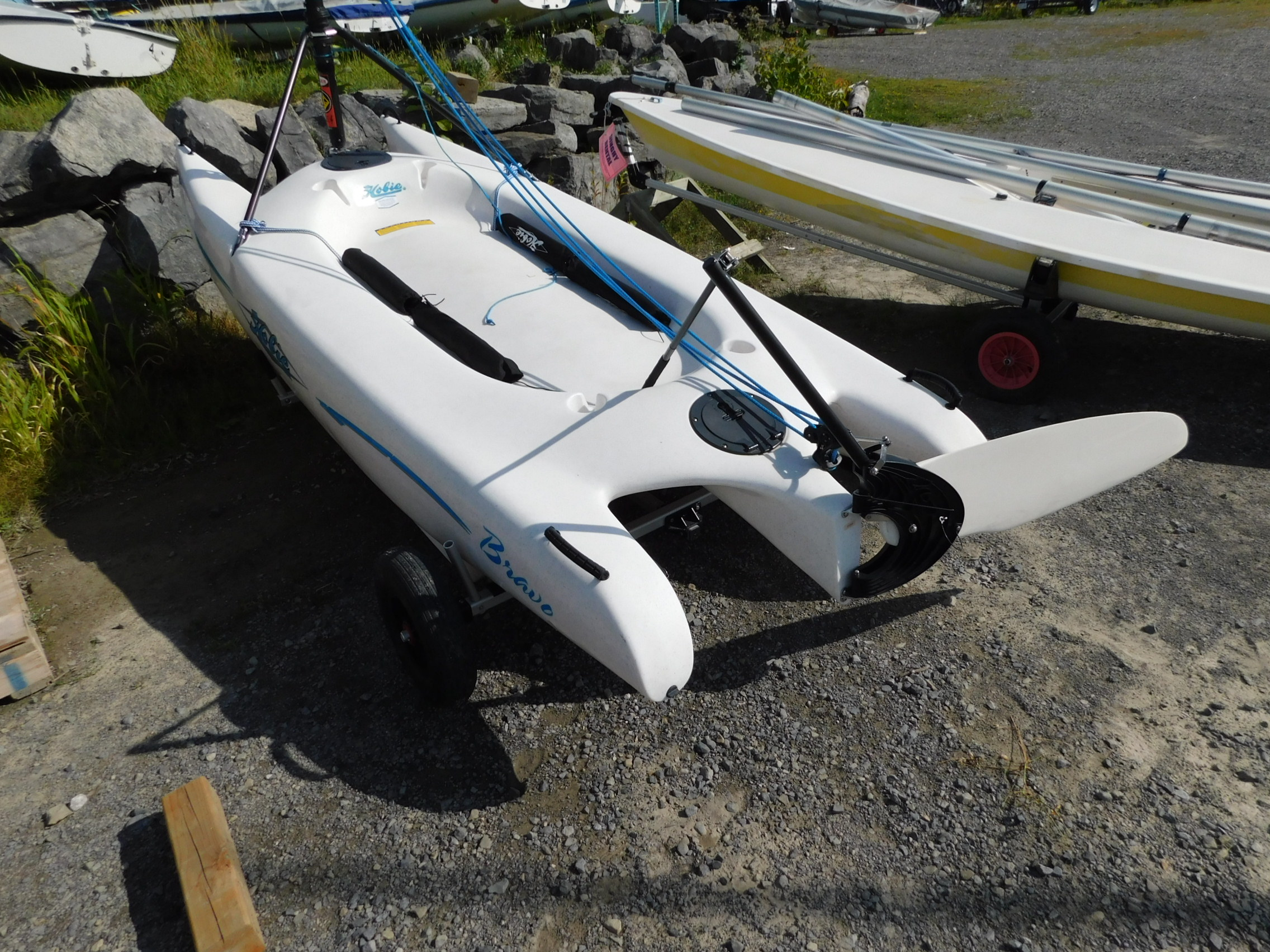
Hobie Bravo showing the single rudder configuration

The Bravo is a recreational sailboat, with the dual hulls and cockpit made from rotomolded polyethylene and an aluminum rotating mast, supported by a bi-pod instead of standing wire rigging. It has a single square-topped, roller furling sail, a catboat rig with no boom and a mast-top mounted float to prevent turtling, that also acts as a wind indicator.

The hulls have spooned plumb stems, vertical transoms, a single central skeg-mounted kick-up rudder controlled by a tiller and lack keels. This allows beaching or ground transportation on a trailer.

The design displaces 195 lb (88 kg) and has a draft of 0.50 ft (0.15 m).

The boat features a narrow fixed cockpit between the hulls with a built in cooler and cup holders, as well as hiking straps.

== Operational history ==
A Boats.com review noted, "the new Bravo is Hobie's latest contribution to sailing simplicity. The Bravo's large sail area makes it responsive in light winds, while the roller-furling main and square-top sail design allow for controlled sailing in all wind conditions. With its unmatched ease of use, comfort and stability, the Hobie Bravo is ideal for new sailors and experienced sailors of all ages."

== See also ==
- List of sailing boat types
