= Hobie Cat =

Small sailing catamaran

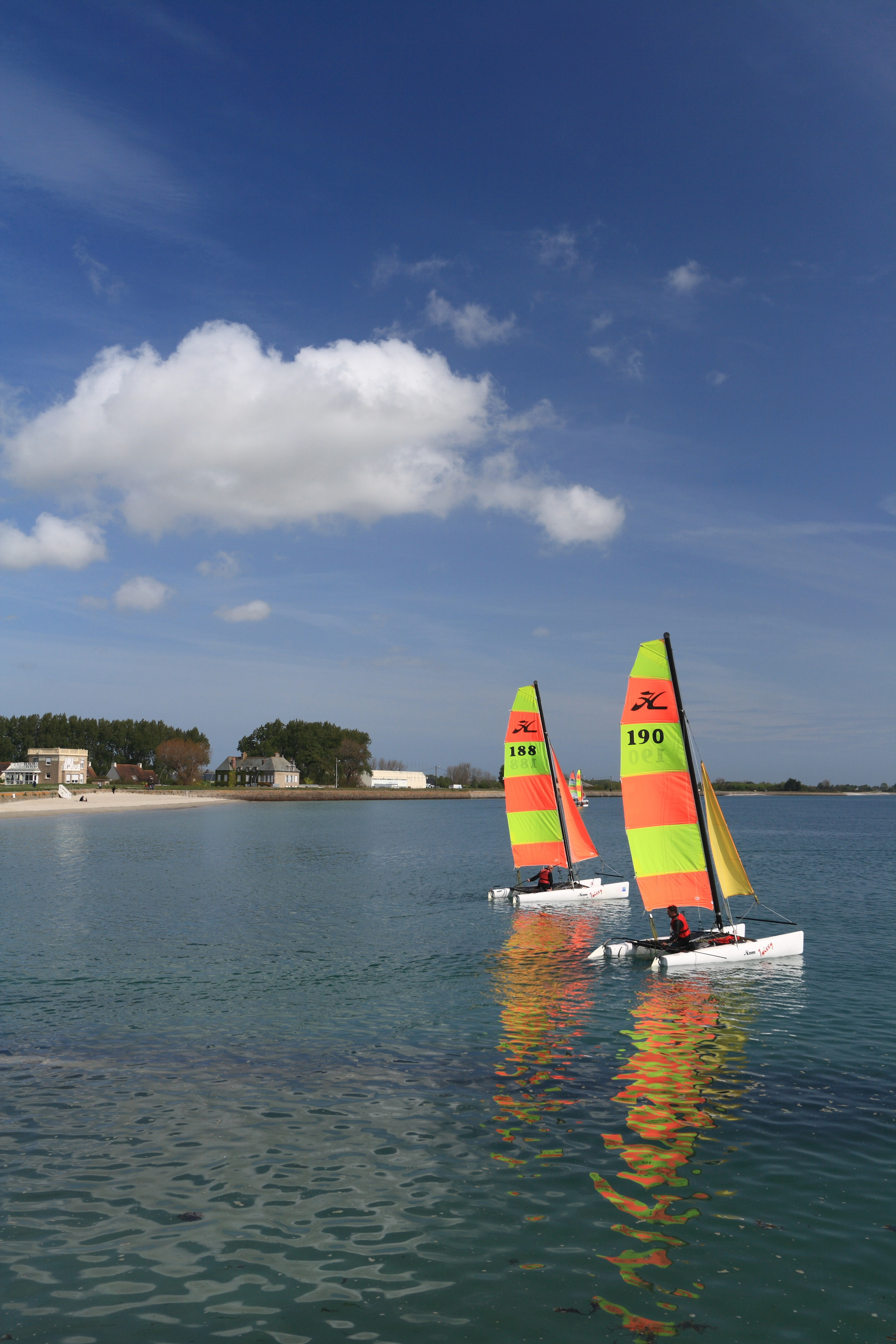
Two Hobie Cats sailing in St Vaast, Normandy, France

Hobie Cat is a company that manufactures watercraft and other products as the Hobie Cat Company. "Hobie Cat" can also refer to specific products of the company, notably its sailing catamarans. Its fiberglass catamaran models range in nominal length between 14 feet (4.3 m) and 18 feet (5.5 m). Rotomolded catamaran models range in length between 12 feet (3.7 m) and 17 feet (5.2 m). Other sailing vessels in the Hobie Cat lineup include, monocats, dinghies, and trimarans, ranging in length between 9 feet (2.7 m) and 20 feet (6.1 m). Its largest product was the Hobie 33, 33 feet (10 m) in length. The company's non-sailing product line includes surfboards, kayaks, stand-up paddle boards, pedalboards, eyeware, and e-bikes. It was founded in 1961 by Hobart (Hobie) Alter, who originally manufactured surfboards.

== History ==
In the late 1950s, Alter opened a surfboard shop, capitalizing on the popularity of surfing, at the time, relatively new. In 1961, after attending a boat show in Anaheim, California where he sold surfboards adjacent to Art Javes, designer of the Aqua Cat 12 catamaran, he decided to design a catamaran which would be easily beached, and made of fiberglass. The first production Hobie Cat was launched on July 4, 1968. It featured a structure similar to the Aqua Cat, but was slightly heavier, with asymmetrically-shaped hulls that did not rely on daggerboards.

In 1969, Hobie released the Hobie 16, their most popular catamaran, and the world's largest one-design catamaran class, with over 135,000 boats built. This was followed by many other similar beachcats in the 1970s and 80s as the popularity of sailing—and Hobie Cats, especially—exploded. Hobie introduced the Hobie 18 in 1976, the Hobie 17 in 1985, the Hobie 21 in 1987, the Hobie 18SX in 1989, the Hobie 17 Sport in 1990, the Hobie 20 in 1991, and the Hobie 21 Sport Cruiser in 1992.

In 1996, Hobie introduced the Pursuit kayak, the first of a new generation of boats built using rotomolded polyethylene. This production method is less expensive and time consuming than the fiberglass molds used in the original series of catamarans, and results in a very strong and durable hull, but one which is not as smooth or light as those produced using fiberglass. After perfecting the rotomolded technique on a series small kayaks the company offered their first rotomolded catamaran, the Hobie Wave in 1994. The largest of the rotomolded catamarans, the Hobie Getaway was launched in 2000, then the smallest, the Hobie Bravo was launched in 2001. Hobie also introduced their “mirage drive” on their kayaks in 1997, designed to quickly and efficiently propel the boats through the water, while still allowing shallow draft operation, as the drive “folds up” against the bottom of the hull when not in use. Hobie kayaks began to quickly outsell the catamarans in the 2000s, and became a significant focus of the company, with Hobie introducing fishing and sailing variants, along with SUPs (first introduced in 2005).

Hobie discontinued many of its catamaran designs starting in 2003, initially with the Hobie 17 & 18, then the Hobie 21SC, Hobie 14, Hobie 20 and Hobie Bravo, as the sailing market contracted and the boats were no longer selling enough to justify continued production. Sailboat sales lagged behind kayaks, thanks in part to the popularity of the mirage drive and Hobie’s rugged, high quality recreational and fishing-focused designs. Hobie continued to support all of the discontinued boats with parts and accessories, in many cases for decades after discontinuation. As of 17 October 2024, the production line consists of the Hobie 16, Hobie Wave, Hobie Getaway, and Hobie Mirage Island, and Hobie Tandem Island, along with numerous kayak and SUP models.

== Changes in ownership ==
Hobie Alter sold the Hobie Cat Company to the Coleman Company in 1975. In 1982, Coast Catamaran (The official name of the Hobie Cat Company at that time) bought dinghy company Vagabond and its line of dinghy designs from Ron Holder and produced a series of dinghies (Hobie Hawk, Hobie Holder 12, Hobie Holder 14, Hobie Holder 17 & Hobie Holder 20) and monohulls in the 1980s and 1990s, including a 33 foot keelboat (Hobie 33), all of which were quite successful, though they never reached the same popularity as their signature catamarans and were discontinued not long thereafter.

In 1989, the Hobie Cat Company was split between Hobie Cat Company (North America) and Hobie Cat Europe and sold separately, the latter of which began operating independently and designing and producing its own catamarans. The two companies shared worldwide production & distribution rights to the Hobie Cat designs, but otherwise operated as separate entities. Hobie Cat Europe went on to introduce many race oriented catamaran designs and has been the impetus behind most of the “modernization” of Hobie’s production line, with most of Hobie North America’s designs remaining fixed since the 1980s & 90s or moving towards rotomolded boats, SUPs and kayaks, which Hobie focused on heavily in the 2000s. Hobie Europe is responsible for all of Hobie’s Formula 18 and Formula 20 boat designs, as well as several other race and youth sailing boats. Most of Hobie Europe’s production line was not made available in the US, except to owners willing to pay to have them imported. Notable exceptions included the Hobie Tiger and Hobie Wildcat, which were eventually offered in the US to compete with F18 offerings from Nacra, as the popularity of F18 racing in the US grew. Hobie Europe also built their own variant of the Hobie 18 which featured pivoting/retractable centerboards instead of daggerboards. Hobie Europe also spawned a further subdivision, Hobie Australasia, in 2000.

In 1995, The Hobie Cat Company (North America) was sold again to a new private owner.

The Hobie Cat Company purchased back Hobie Europe and its subsidiary Hobie Australasia in 2012, combining the three into one company again. Hobie Europe found itself struggling under the weight of a wide range of boat models, compared to the relatively few offerings of Hobie North America (which had discontinued much of its catamaran production at that time and consolidated production around the Hobie 16, rotomolded boats and kayaks).

The Hobie Cat Company was sold in March 2021 to venture capitalists, including Maynard Industries. In November 2022, Hobie entered an agreement with Starting Line Sailing to produce Hobie 16s in Bristol, RI, after production had lagged significantly due in part to supply chain and logistics issues during the COVID-19 pandemic. On December 12, 2023, that arrangement was terminated, and production was moved to Mexico.

On September 24, 2025, The Hobie Cat Company was sold to Bass Pro, with production moved again to Lebanon, Missouri.

== Watercraft ==
Hobie has made a large variety of catamarans and dinghies since the company’s inception, beginning with the Hobie 14 and later the Hobie 16. They’re most famous for their fiberglass catamarans, though the company has made significant numbers of rotomolded boats beginning in the 1990s and 2000s. While the company briefly produced dinghies and monohulls in the 1980s as well, they never reached anywhere near the same popularity as their catamarans and were discontinued after a handful of years.

=== Fiberglass catamarans ===
Model	Length overall	Beam	Draft	Weight	Mast Height	Sail Area	Max Capacity	Intended Crew	Production Years	Boats built	MFG	Description
Hobie 14	14' 0”	7' 8"	8"	240 lb (110 kg)	22' 3"	118 ft²	353 lbs (1-2)	1	1968-2004	46,000	USA	one sail single-handed cat
Hobie 16	16' 7"	7' 11"	10"	320 lb (150 kg)	26' 6"	218 ft²	800 lbs (1-4)	2	1969–present	135,000	USA	double-handed main & jib cat
Hobie 3.5	14' 0”	6’ 0”	8”	230 lb (100 kg)	18’ 0”	90 ft²	140 lbs	1	1975-1979	750	USA	kid friendly 14' cat
Hobie 18/18SX	18' 0”	8' 0” (w/o wings)	10" - 2' 6"	400–439 lb (181–199 kg)	28' 1" (29’ 6” SX)	240 ft² (220 ft² SX)	800+ lbs (2-4)	2	1976-2003	18,000	USA	beachcat w/sym. hulls & daggers. SX adds taller mast & wings
Hobie 17 (SE or Sport)	17' 0”	8' 0” (w/o wings)	5" - 1' 6"	340 lb (150 kg)	27' 7"	168 ft²	400 lbs (1-2)	1	1985-2003	~6,200	USA	solo boat with wings & mainsail, Sport - adds jib
Hobie 21SE	21' 0”	9' 6" (14' 0” w/wings)	11" - 3' 1"	565 lb (256 kg)	33' 0”	300 ft² + asym spin	2 - 3	2	1988-1990	900	USA	Sym. hull cat w/wings & spin
Hobie 21SC	21' 0”	8' 6" (w/o wings)	11" - 3' 1"	600 lb (270 kg)	29' 0”	222 ft² + RF reacher	2 - 4	2	1988-2003	~250	USA	Sym. hull cat w/forward tramp, wings, furling main, cubby & cooler
Hobie Miracle 20	19' 6"	8' 6"	5" - 2' 9"	420 lb (190 kg)	31' 0”	250 ft²	2	2	1991-2007		USA	sym. hull cat
Hobie Club 15 (EU)	16' 4"	7' 5"	?	342 lb (155 kg)	23' 7"	163 ft²	705 lbs (1-3)	2	1992-		Europe	European sailing school & resort boat
Hobie TriFoiler	22' 0”	19' 0”	?	320 lb (150 kg)	( 2 ) 18' 0”	215 ft²		2	1994-1999	180	USA	Sailing hydrofoil, Trimaran
Hobie Tiger (EU)	18' 0”	8' 6"	7" - 3' 9"	397 lb (180 kg)	29' 6"	220 ft² + asym spin	529 lbs (1-2)	2	1995-~2009	1,100	Europe	F18 class
Hobie Fox (EU)	20' 0”	8' 6"	?	419 lb (190 kg)	31' 2"	146 ft² + asym spin	2	2	2000-~2007		Europe	Formula 20 class
Hobie Dragoon (EU)	12' 10"	7’ 1”	10"	229 lb (104 kg)	21’ 0”	125 ft² + 95 sf asym spin	529 lbs (1-3)	1-2	2001-	800	Europe	kids-oriented race boat
Hobie FX-One (EU)	17' 0”	8' 3"	6" - 3' 9"	340 lb (150 kg)	27' 9"	172 ft² + asym spin	353 lbs (1-2)	2	2002-~2009		Europe	race boat
Hobie Max (EU)	16' 1”	8' 2"	4"	320 lb (150 kg)		192 ft² + 200 sf asym spin		2	2007-?		Europe	ISAF youth catamaran (proposed)
Hobie Pacific (EU)	18' 0”	8' 6"	?	375 lb (170 kg)	29' 6"	211 ft²	529 lbs (2-3)	2			Europe	F18 class
Hobie Pearl (EU)	18' 0”	8' 5" (w/o wings)		397 lb (180 kg)	29’ 6”	228 ft² + 168 sf RF spin	529 lbs	2	2008–present		Europe	sym. hulls w/centerboards & wings
Hobie Wildcat (EU)	18' 0”	8' 6"	7" - 3' 9"	397 lb (180 kg)	29' 6"	454 ft² w/asym spin	529 lbs (2-3)	2	2009–present	332	Europe	F18 class

==== Hobie 14 ====
The Hobie 14 was the original catamaran designed by Hobie Alter in 1968. The 14 was originally designed to be sailed from the beach through the surf and back, with features to make sailing on and off the beach easier, such as the iconic "banana" shaped hull profile, kick-up rudders and asymmetric hulls. It's a unirig design with a single sail, designed to be sailed solo or "singlehanded." Hobie later introduced the Hobie 14 "Turbo" or the "turbo" conversion kit, which added a roller furling jib, trapeze and dolphin striker. No longer manufactured by Hobie North America, the Hobie 14 was discontinued in North America in 2004, but is still produced in limited numbers by Hobie Europe and Hobie Brazil.

The Hobie 14 is very sensitive to weight placement fore and aft as a result of the banana hull shape. In rough water, strong winds or weight placed too far forward, the leeward bow is somewhat prone to "dig in," resulting in what is known as a "pitchpole."

The Hobie 14 has a D-PN of 86.4 with the Turbo version faster at 83.1.

==== Hobie 16 ====
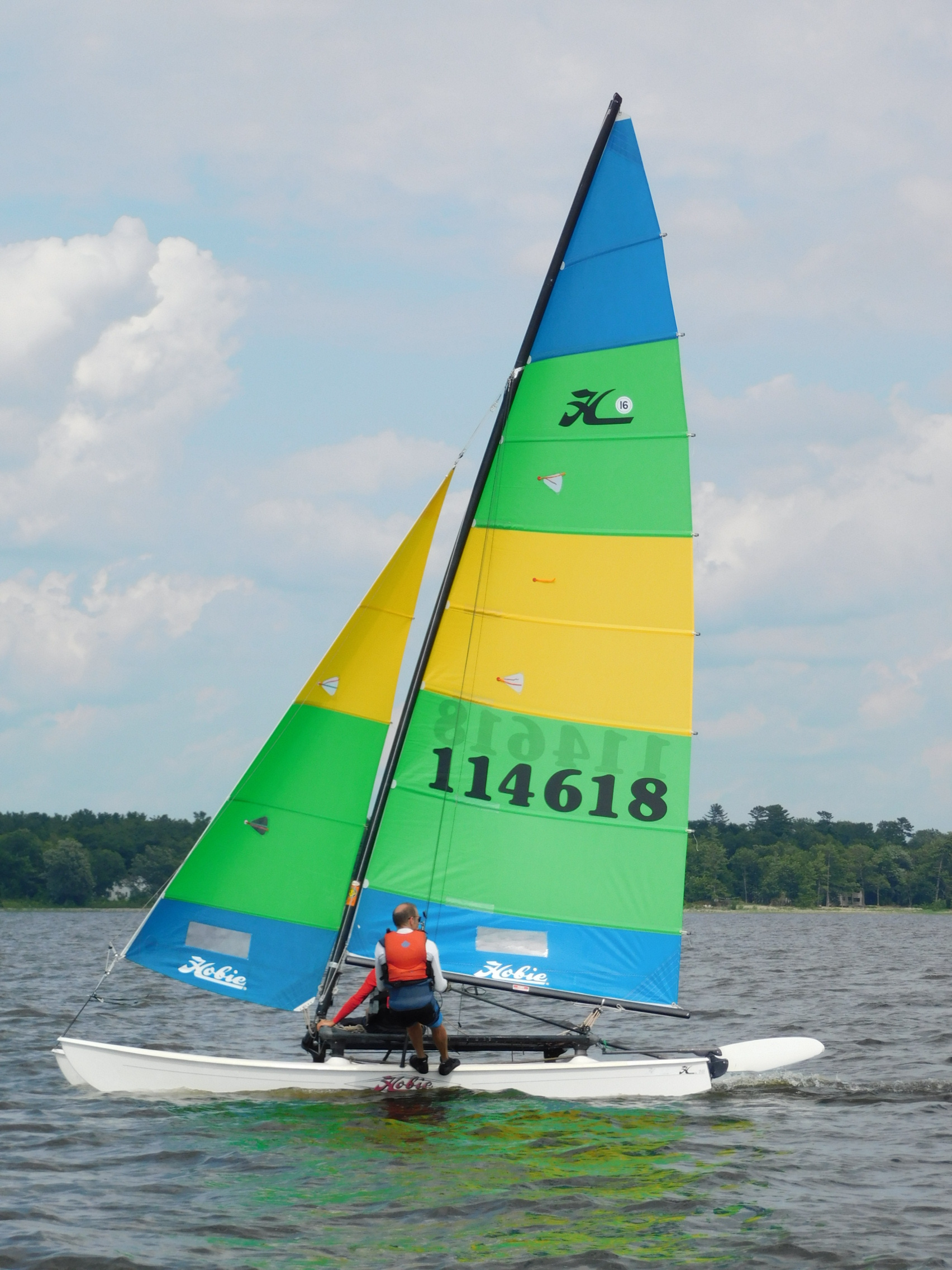
Hobie 16

Hobie introduced the Hobie 16 in 1969, and it went on to become the most popular catamaran ever built, both for recreational sailing and as a one-design racer. It was developed to be a bigger, more stable upgrade to the Hobie 14, designed for a crew of two. The boat is 16 ft 7 in (5.05 m) long, 7 ft 11 in (2.41 m) wide, has a mast 26 ft 6 in (8.08 m) tall, and weighs 320 lb (150 kg). As with the 14, it is intended to be sailed from the beach through the surf, and to be surfed back in on the waves to the beach, with many of the same features and similar asymmetric "banana" hulls. Both jib and main sails are fully battened and total 218 sq ft (20 m^{2}). A double trapeze system comes standard on the Hobie 16. The Hobie 16 is still in production around the world.

==== Hobie 18 ====
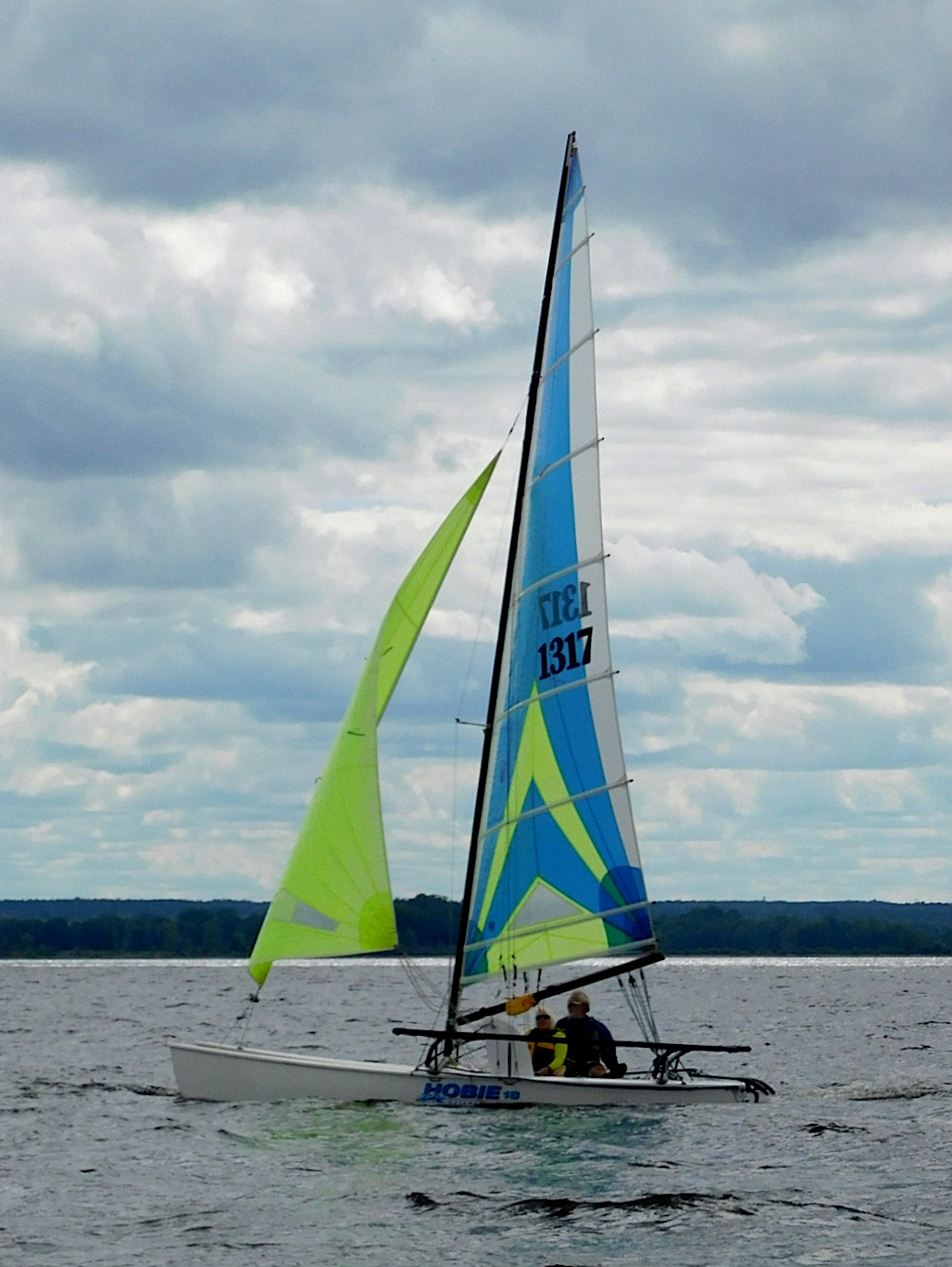
Hobie 18

Hobie introduced the Hobie 18 in 1976 as a significant upgrade in sailing performance, tunability and capacity as compared to the Hobie 16 and 14. The Hobie Class Association consider the Hobie 18 the most versatile of all the Hobie beachcats. The Hobie 18 was designed to be not only fast but also rugged. It is designed to be sailed by a crew of two, but can easily carry four passengers when cruising. Experienced sailors can sail the Hobie 18 solo. Unlike the Hobie 14 and 16, the Hobie 18 has symmetrical hulls, using daggerboards to maintain course stability. The boat features a fully battened mainsail and rolling/furling jib. A double trapeze system is also standard equipment on the Hobie 18. Hobie introduced "wing seats" for the Hobie 18 in the early 1980s with wings that extended from the front to rear crossbar. These later became known as "magnum" wings when Hobie introduced the Hobie 18SX in 1987 which featured a taller mast and longer wings, which extended approx. 20 in (0.51 m) beyond the crossbars for more flexibility on weight placement. The SX model featured a 19 in (0.48 m) taller mast, higher aspect mylar sails. Wings of both types, magnum and SX, are in much demand today due to the added comfort and space provided. They add about 40 lb (18 kg). Much to the dismay of many Hobie enthusiasts, the Hobie 18 is currently no longer produced.

==== Hobie 17 ====
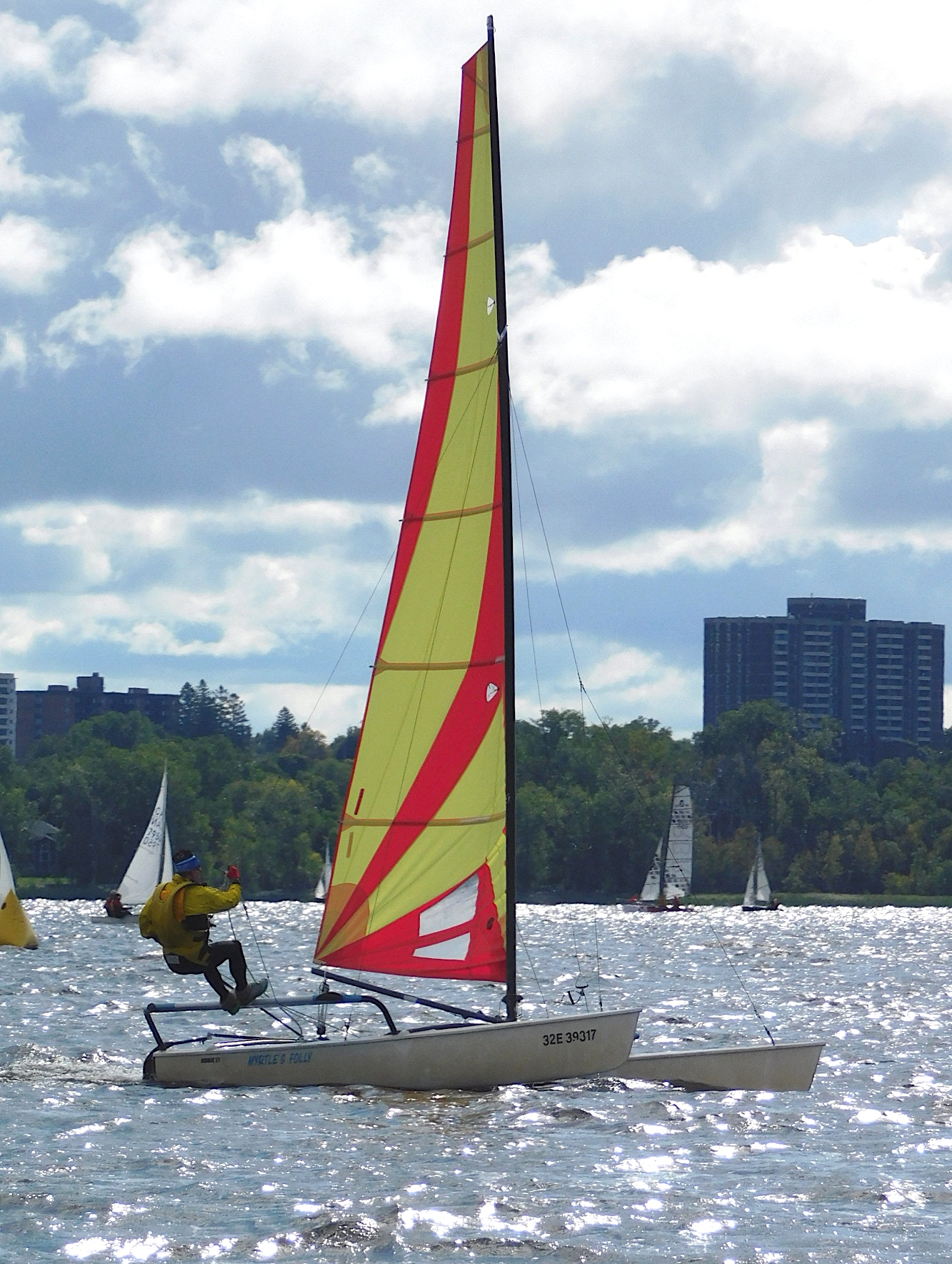
Hobie 17

The Hobie 17 was introduced in 1985 and was available in two trim 'packages': the SE and the Sport. The SE version was a unirig boat with a mainsail only and wings, and was designed to be singlehanded. The Sport version included a jib and a small boomlett that was not attached to the mast and was intended for recreational sailing by two people. It was 17 ft (5.2 m) long, 8 ft (2.4 m) wide, had a 27 ft 7 in (8.41 m) mast and 168 sq ft (15.6 m^{2}) of sail area (200 ft^{2} or 18.6 m^{2} with the jib). Both models had swinging centerboards and 'wings'. The uni-rig or catboat sail plan allows the 17SE to 'point' well, or sail closer to straight upwind than many other sloop-rigged catamarans. The Hobie 17 was discontinued in 2003.

The Hobie 17 had a Portsmouth Number of 783. The SE version had a D-PN of 74.0 and the Sport version had 74.5.

==== Hobie 21SC ====
The 21SC (for Sport Cruiser) was Hobie Cat's first 'family boat'. Intended for casual sailing, this boat has a front trampoline, wings, an outboard motor-mount, and a built-in cooler. Though larger than the Getaway at 21 ft (6.4 m) long, 8 ft 6 in (2.59 m) wide, with a 29 ft (8.8 m) mast and 222 sq ft (21 m^{2}) of sail, it could be raced off a D-PN of 74.5. The 21SC was quickly displaced by the more rugged, cheaper Getaway and has been phased out by Hobie Cat.

==== Hobie 21SE ====
The 21SE hulls are similar to the 21SC but the similarities end there, the 21SE is a performance oriented boat. It is no longer in production but it had a beam of nearly 10 ft (3.0 m), and 14 ft (4.3 m) with the wings. The boat was intended for a racing crew of two or three adults. It also had centreboards instead of daggerboards a 33 ft (10 m) mast and 300 sq ft (28 m^{2}). of sail. It weighs 700 lb (320 kg) and has a D-PN of 67.0. It had arched, curved crossbars. It was raced as a one design boat in professional racing circuits. The boat is fast and stable but probably saw low production numbers because of its weight, the need to telescope the hulls for trailering and because it is difficult to right the boat if it capsizes without outside assistance.

==== Miracle 20 ====
Introduced in 1991, the Miracle 20 has 250 sq ft (23 m^{2}) of sail area and high aspect ratio mylar sails, as yet another significant performance improvement over the Hobie 18. The Hobie 20 eliminated the hull lip, a significant source of drag, and moved towards higher aspect ratio sails and daggerboards. The 20 was 19 ft 6 in (5.94 m) long, 8 ft 6 in (2.59 m) wide, with a 31 ft (9.4 m) mast, weighed 420 lb (190 kg), and had a D-PN of 65.0. The Hobie 20 was discontinued in 2007 after a 16 year production run. The Miracle 20 was designed by Jack Groeneveld, a Dutch catamaran sailor (European champion Prindle 19, winner of the Prindle 19 nationals etc.)

==== TriFoiler ====
The Hobie TriFoiler was one of the fastest production sailboats ever created. Introduced in 1994, it was based on a series of boats designed by Greg and Dan Ketterman and sailed by Russel Long, which eventually culminated in Long setting the A-Class Catamaran world sailing speed record in 1992 in the boat "Longshot". That record remains unbroken. The TriFoiler is based on Longshot and this sailing hydrofoil stands as the most unusual of Hobie Cat's boats. Also designed by Greg Ketterman, this trimaran has two sails, one on each ama, and hydrofoils that lift the hulls out of the water at wind speeds of 10–11 mph (16–18 km/h), allowing the boat to reach speeds up to 45 mph (72 km/h) and pull over 2 g in jibe turns.

The TriFoiler was 22 ft (6.7 m) long, 19 ft (5.8 m) wide, weighed 145 kg (320 lb), and was sailed from a "cockpit" by two people. The boat was fitted with two 18 ft (5.5 m) tall masts, with a total sail area of 215 sq ft (20.0 m^{2}). It was the largest multihull boat built by Hobie Cat, with 170 produced between 1995 and 1999; another 30 were built independently prior to production starting at Hobie Cat. Production ceased because of limited popularity; the boat was expensive and fragile, and could be used only in low-wave conditions with winds between 10 and 25 mph (16 and 40 km/h).

==== Hobie Tiger ====
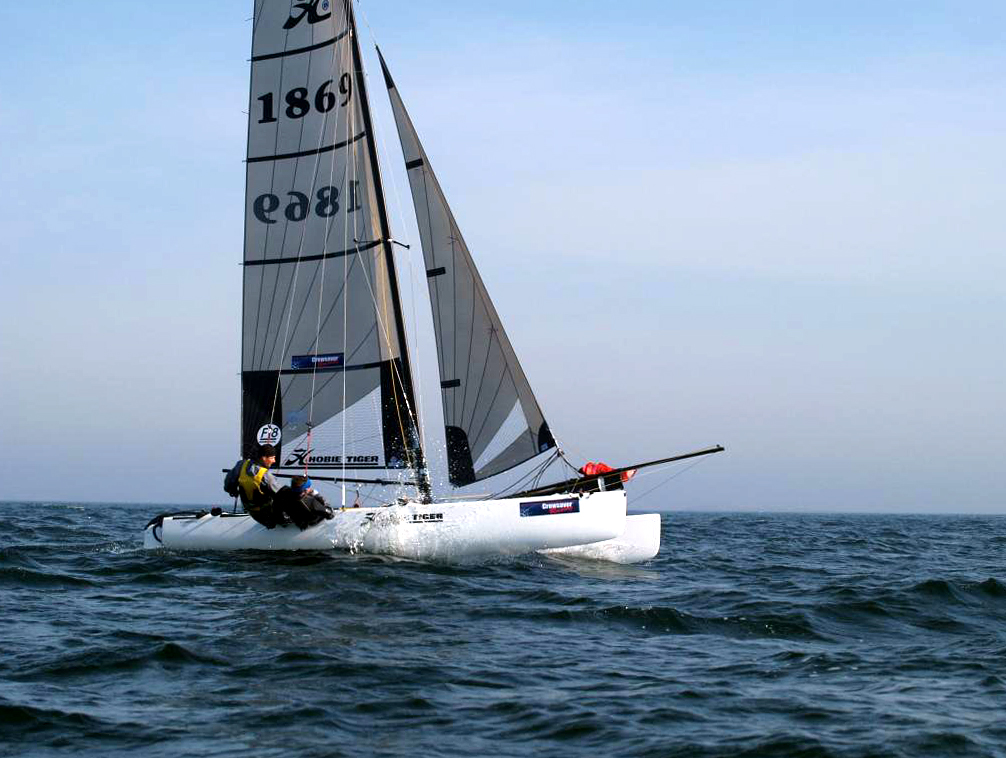
Hobie Tiger

The Hobie Tiger, a Hobie Cat Europe import, was Hobie Cat's entry into the Formula 18 multihull class. The Tiger was very popular and successful both in class racing and Formula 18. At 18 ft (5.5 m) long, 8 ft 6 in (2.59 m) wide, with a 29 ft 6 in (8.99 m) mast and 227 sq ft (21 m^{2}) of sail area (452 sq ft (42 m^{2}) with the spinnaker). It weighs in at a minimum of 396 lb (180 kg) as to conform to the Formula 18 specifications. The class D-PN is 62.1. Though originally only available in Europe, many were imported and sold in the US. At its introduction, it was a very competitive F18 boat, but had been eclipsed by newer F18 designs by the end of its production run.

==== Hobie Fox ====
The Hobie Fox was designed by Hobie Cat Europe to meet the Formula 20 racing class rules. The hull shape was designed by world champion A-Class sailor Nils Bunkenberg. It had a modern wave-piercing hull design. It had a double trapeze, asymmetrical spinnaker with snuffer retrieval system, high aspect ratio daggerboards, race rudders, and sails designed by Giorgio Zuccoli. It was 20 ft (6.1 m) long, had an 8 ft 6 in (2.59 m) beam and weighed 419 lb (190 kg). Mainsail area was 194 sq ft (18.0 m^{2}). Jibsail area was 52 sq ft (4.8 m^{2}). Spinnaker area was 269 sq ft (25.0 m^{2}). With a D-PN of 60.4, the Fox was at one point the fastest of the Hobie family.

==== Hobie Dragoon ====
The Hobie Dragoon was designed by Hobie Cat Europe as a youth trainer for racing. Age target was 12 to 14 years. Double trapeze and spinnaker option to introduce young sailors to high performance. Length: 12 ft 10 in (3.91 m), Beam: 7 ft 1 in (2.16 m), Mast Length: 21 ft (6.4 m), Sail Area: 118 sq ft (11.0 m^{2}). Main plus Jib, Weight: 230 lb (100 kg). D-PN: 83.0

==== FX-One ====
The FX-One was designed and produced by the France-based Hobie Cat Europe company. The boat was designed both for single-handed racing (mainsail + spinnaker) and dual-crew sailing (jib + mainsail + spinnaker). In both configurations, this boat is eligible for the IHCA racing class. In the two-sailor configuration, this boat is also eligible for the Class 104 multihull class. Relatively uncommon in North America, the FX-One is 17 ft 8 in (5.38 m) long, with a 27 ft 9 in (8.46 m) mast and 172 sq ft (16.0 m^{2}) of mainsail area, 3.98 m^{2} (42.8 sq ft) of jib area, 17.5 m^{2} (188 sq ft) of spinnaker area, and weighs in at 333 lb (151 kg) with the dual crew set-up. It features wavepiercing hulls, and daggerboards. The D-PN is listed as 70.1 without spinnaker and 68.5 singlehanded with spinnaker.

==== Hobie Pacific ====
The Hobie Pacific was based on the Hobie Tiger design, but had skegs instead of daggerboards, a smaller rig, and no boom. The boat was intended to be easier to handle than a F18 boat, and targeted at sailing schools. Sail area was 211 sq ft (20 m^{2}), the optional spinnaker was 200 sq ft (19 m^{2}).

==== Hobie Wildcat ====
The Hobie Wildcat was introduced in 2009. It is Hobie's latest Formula 18 boat and has the same measurements, weight, and sail area as the Hobie Tiger, per F18 box rules. The boat features wave-piercing bows, a flat bottom in the stern for better planing, and high aspect ratio mainsail & daggerboards.

=== Rotomolded polyethylene boats ===
Model	Length overall	Beam	Draft	Weight	Mast Height	Sail Area	Max Capacity	Intended Crew	Production Years	Boats built	MFG	Description
Hobie Monocat 12	11' 9"	4’ 0”	4"	150 lb (68 kg)	18' 0”	90 ft²	1-2	1	1973-1978		USA	Monocat w/single CL daggerboard
Hobie 10	10’ 0”	3' 8"	4"	90 lb (41 kg)							USA	ABS daggerboard dinghy
Hobie Wave	13' 1”	7' 0”	11"	245 lb (111 kg)	20 '0”	95 ft²	800 lbs (1-4)	1	1994–present		USA	ABS beachcat
Hobie Bravo	12' 0”	4’ 5"	9"	195 lb (88 kg)	19' 0”	86 ft²	400 lbs (1-2)	1	2001-2020		USA	ABS monocat
Hobie Getaway	16 '7"	7' 8" (10' 4" w/wings)	10"	390 lb (180 kg)	25' 0”	180 ft²	1000 lbs (1-6)	1-2	2001–present		USA	family focused boat w/wings & forward tramp
Mirage Adventure Island	16' 7”	3’ 8" (9’ 6” w/amas extended)	2" - 2' 0”	185 lb (84 kg)	15' 2"	65 ft²	400 lbs	1	2007-2021		USA	Trimaran kayak, (pedal) MirageDrive
Mirage Tandem Island	18' 6”	4’ 0” (10’ 0” w/amas extended)	2" - 2' 0”	240 lb (110 kg)	18’ 0”	90 ft²	600 lbs	1-2	2010–present		USA	Trimaran kayak, (pedal) MirageDrive
Hobie T2 (EU)	16' 0”	8' 0"	10" - 2' 6"	338 lb (153 kg)	24' 7.3"	172 ft² + RF asym spin	900 lbs (3-4)	2	2013-2018		Europe	performance ABS cat

=== Rotomolded boats ===
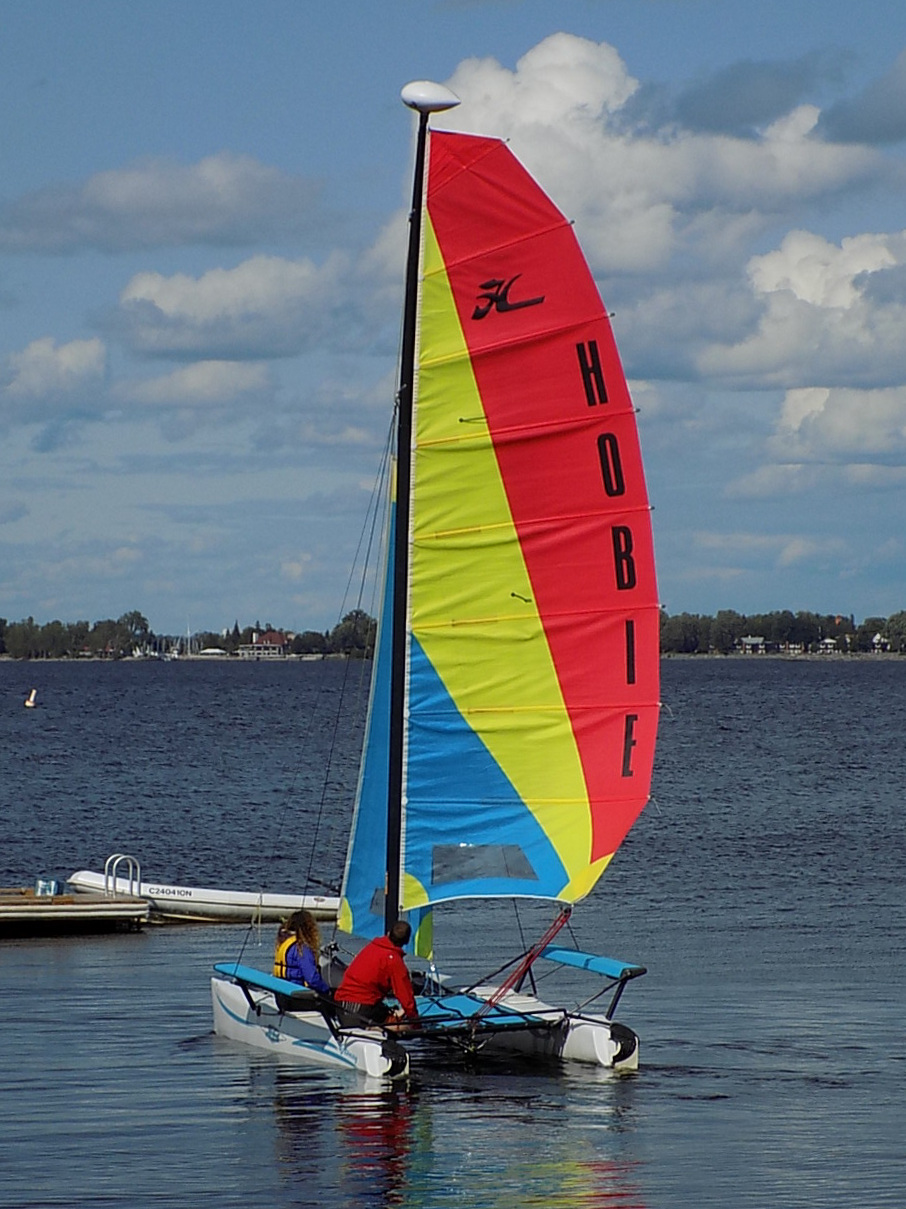
Hobie Getaway, a design with rotomolded plastic hulls

This series of boats is created of rotomolded polyethylene plastic and is intended for casual and new sailors.

These can be split into two main categories, Hobie Cat USA rotomolded boats and Hobie Cat Europe rotomoulded boats. The boats from the US include the Bravo, Wave and Getaway, whilst the European range consists of the Catsy, Teddy, Twixxy, Max and Tattoo or "T2".

==== Hobie Bravo ====
The Bravo is the smallest the Hobie rotomolded catamarans at 12 ft (3.7 m) and is intended for one person but can carry two. The relatively narrow beam (4 ft 5 in (1.35 m)) compared to its 19 ft (5.8 m) mast leads to considerable heeling, or tipping of the boat compared to other catamarans. The Bravo has the distinction of being able to furl its sail around the mast. The D-PN is 100.0.

==== Hobie Wave ====
The Hobie Wave is intended for one to four passengers, but is easily handled by one with its 13 ft (4.0 m) length, 7 ft (2.1 m) beam, and 20 ft (6.1 m) mast. The Wave was designed by the Morelli/Melvin Engineering firm, and has proved to be extremely popular with beach resorts and rental operations. It is often praised for being rugged and easy to sail. While described as slow and underpowered by catamaran standards, it has a D-PN of 92.1, similar to a Laser (dinghy) that is often considered to be a performance dinghy. Although marketed as a recreational sailboat, an owner-controlled racing class has organized and held regattas since 1998.

==== Hobie Getaway ====
The Hobie Getaway is marketed as a "social boat" and is designed with room for up to 6 people, more than Hobie Cat's other boats. The boat has a trampoline both forward and aft of the mast, and is the only rotomolded Hobie to come stock with a jib and have an available trapeze. At 16 ft 7 in (5.05 m), the Getaway is the same length as the Hobie 16; the beam is 7 ft 8 in (2.34 m) and the mast is 25 ft (7.6 m) tall. It has a D-PN of 83.3.

==== Hobie Tattoo or "T2" ====
The Hobie Tattoo or "T2" was a "performance oriented" ABS boat, sold primarily in Europe, though a few were sold in the US before the boat was ultimately discontinued.

=== Fiberglass monohulls and dinghies ===
Model	Length overall	Beam	Draft	Displ.	Ballast Wt	Mast Height	Sail Area	Max Capacity	Intended Crew	Production Years	Boats built	Description
Holder Hawk (Holder 9)	9' 0”	3' 11”	2.1' (max)	75 lb (34 kg)	N/A			1		1984-		Daggerboard dinghy
Hobie Holder 12	12' 0”	5' 0”	6" - 2' 6"	115 lb (52 kg)	N/A	18’ 0”	68 ft²	1-2	1	1984-	5,000	Centerboard dinghy
Hobie One-12	12' 0”	5' 0”	6" - 2' 6"	125 lb (57 kg)	N/A		68 ft²	1-2	1	1987-1995		Daggerboard dinghy
Hobie Holder 14	13' 8"	6' 2"	6" - 3' 10"	265 lb (120 kg)		20’ 0”	110 ft²	2-4	1-2	1983-1986		Centerboard dinghy
Hobie Holder 14 MKII	13' 8"	6' 2"	5” - 3' 2"	265 lb (120 kg)		18’ 7”	107 ft²	2-4	1-2	1984-1990		Daggerboard dinghy
Hobie One-14	13' 8"	6' 2"	6” - 3' 2"	275 lb (125 kg)			107 ft²	2-4	1-2	1986-1995		Centerboard dinghy
Hobie Holder 17	17' 0”	7' 0”	1' 8" - 4' 2"	950 lb (430 kg)	325 lb (147 kg)		147 ft² + 210 sf spin	2-4	1-2	1981-	400	Swing Keel Monohull w/full cabin
Hobie Holder 17 DS	17' 0”	7' 0”	1' 8" - 4' 2"	925 lb (420 kg)	325 lb (147 kg)		147 ft²	2-4	1-2	1982-	400	daysailor variant - Swing Keel Mono w/cuddy cabin
Hobie Holder 20	20’ 4”	7’ 10”	1' 0” - 3' 7”	1,160 lb (530 kg)	260 lb (120 kg)	26’ 1”	194 ft² + sym spin			1980-1987	265	Lifting Keel Monohull w/symm. spin
Hobie 33	33' 0”	8' 0”	1’ 10” - 5' 6"	4,000 lb (1,800 kg)	1,900 lb (860 kg)	36' 0”	428 ft² + 838 sf sym spin		4-6	1982-1987	147	Fixed or Lifting Keel Mono w/symm. spin
Hobie 405	13' 3.5”	4' 6”	0' 4” - 0’ 11”	141 lb (64 kg)			85.9 ft² + 95 sf asym spin or 80 sf sym spin		2	1992-	200	Centerboard Dinghy
Hobie Magic 25	24' 7”	7' 7”	1' 0” - 5’ 6”	1,860 lb (840 kg)	858 lb (389 kg)		388 ft² + 521 sf asym spin		4	1996-	70	Lifting Keel Sportboat w/retracting bowsprit, asym spin & CF Mast

==== Hobie Holder series ====
The Hobie Holder boats were originally Designed by Ron Holder and produced by Vagabond sailboats, which was later bought by the Coast Catamaran Corporation (Hobie Cat) and sold under the Hobie brand name in the 1980s. It was a series of monohull dinghys of various sizes from 9' 0" to 20' 0" in length. All were discontinued by the end of the decade. Previous versions were sold under the "Vagabond" name, as well as several others, such as the "Vagabond 14," "O'day 14", "Monarch 14" and "Hobie One-14."

==== Hobie 10 ====
The Hobie 10 was a small dinghy produced as a response to the Laser dinghy. It has been discontinued.

==== Hobie 33 ====
The Hobie 33 is a 33 ft (10 m) monohull lift-keel boat designed to be very light and very fast. It is considered a ULDB or ultralight displacement boat, a sportsboat. It was intended to be a trailerable, one design racer/cruiser. To be trailerable in all US states without special overwidth road permits, beam was kept to just 8 ft (2.4 m), which is quite narrow for a boat of this length, although the Hobie 33 was advertised as being capable of sleeping 7 people. A total of 187 Hobie 33s were built between 1982 and 1986.

The design was the brainchild of Hobie Alter and Sheldon Coleman Sr. To start the project a Bill Lee designed ULDB Santa Cruz 27 named "Redline" was purchased, analyzed and then raced in southern California. Once the design stage started Lewie and John Wake were brought in to lend racing yacht design experience. Hobie 18 designer and legendary surfer Phil Edwards designed the keel and rudder.

There is an active North American class association and national championships yearly. The Hobie 33 is still a competitive offshore sailing yacht and as recently as 2006, 'Mad Max' was the Overall Winner in the Newport to Ensenada International Yacht Race, beating vessels of all lengths from 26–90 ft (7.9–27.4 m) on corrected time using the PHRF formula. In 2005, the Hobie 33 was first in the doublehanded division of Transpacific Yacht Race and went on to win its class against fully crewed boats.

== Racing ==
The International Hobie Class Association (IHCA) organizes regattas for multiple classes of Hobie cat all around the world. In North America, called the Hobie Class Association of North America (HCANA), the continent is divided into 16 divisions, with several fleets in each division, in order to help sailors find regattas and events near them, but there are no regional restrictions on who can compete where.

The Hobie 16 fleet remains active as a racing class, with national and world championships attracting large numbers of competitors and, in some cases, requiring separate divisions based on skill level. Local regattas vary in size and formality, ranging from small casual events to larger and more competitive competitions. Across North America, numerous Hobie fleets organize regattas and other events, provide instruction for new sailors, and hold social gatherings.

Hobie 14, 17, 18, 20 and Hobie Waves each have active nationals competitions every year in the US, and many are raced at local regattas as well. The Hobie Wave is a growing segment of the racing community, appreciated by competitors a simple, easy to handle, easy to rig and sail single-handed boat. Discontinued boats have typically a smaller turnout and tend to be much more casual to race. Hobie Nationals and Hobie Worlds tend to rotate around the country/globe, hosted in a different place/by a different fleet each year.

Racing of Hobie catamarans is conducted in a large number of countries around the world, with 20 countries sending their top two teams to Hobie worlds every year. The Hobie 16 has large racing fleets in Europe, North America, Australia, Asia, South America and in the islands of Oceania such as New Caledonia and Fiji. Racing is a mix between casual/recreational races and highly competitive regattas, depending on the class of boat and fleet hosting the regatta.

== See also ==
- List of multihulls
- Hobart "Hobie" Alter – founder and creator of the Hobie Cat
- List of sailboat designers and manufacturers
