= Hobie 18 World Championship =

Hobie 18 Catamaran Worlds

The Hobie 18 World Championships is a bi-annual international sailing regatta for Hobie 18. The event was organized by the host club on behalf of the International Hobie Class Association and since 1987/88 recognized by World Sailing, the sports IOC recognized governing body.

== Editions ==
Event			Host			Sailors			Boats				Ref.
Ed.	Date	Year	Host club	Location	Nat.	No.	Nat.	Cont.	Boats			Mix	Ref.
1		1981		Daytona Beach	United States								
2		1983		Hyères	France								
3		1985		Port Macquarie	Australia								
4		1987		Toronto	Canada	72	6	3	36				
5		1989		Monterey	United States	144	9	3	72	49	0	23	
6		1991		Gaeta	Italy	72	8	3	36				
7		1996	Club Nautic de Sitges	Sitges	Spain	54	5	2	27				
8		1999		Melbourne	Australia	84	3	2	42				
9		2005	Port Melbourne Yacht Club	Melbourne	Australia	56	3	2	28				

== Edition ==
Year	Gold	Silver	Bronze
1981 Daytona Beach	Australia; Ian Bashford; Steven Wheelan	United States; Phil Berman	United States; Miles Wood; Dan Mangus
1983 Hyères	Australia; Brett Dryland; Robin Whitehead	United States; Carlton Tucker	United States; David Rodgers
1985 Port Macquarie	Australia; Gary Metcalf; Brian Myers	United States; Carlton Tucker	Australia; Ian Bashford
1987 Toronto	Australia; Brent Dryland; D. Dryland	United States; Carlton Tucker	Australia; Mark Laruffa; Gary McLennan
1989 Monterey	Australia; Gray Metcalf; Matthew Stephens	Australia; Mark Laruffa; Matt Byrne	United States; Jeff Alter Jr; Meagan Burch
1991 Gaeta	Australia; Clive Kennedy; Donna Kennedy	United States; Jeff Alter; Kathy Ward	Australia; George Owen; Tracy Wood
1996	Australia; Brad Sumner; Amy Johnstone	Italy; Francesco Marcolin; Milena Cerbecto	Italy; Giovanni Passarelli; Daniela Baldi
1999	Australia; Brad Sumner; Amy Johnstone	Australia; Aaron Worrall; Michael Coburn	Australia; Keith Middleton; Suzanne Middleton
2005	Australia; Brad Sumner; Belinda Walcom	Australia; Andrew Nelson; Don McPhee	Australia; Richard Quinn; Michael Quinn
