= Hobie Wave =

Sailboat class

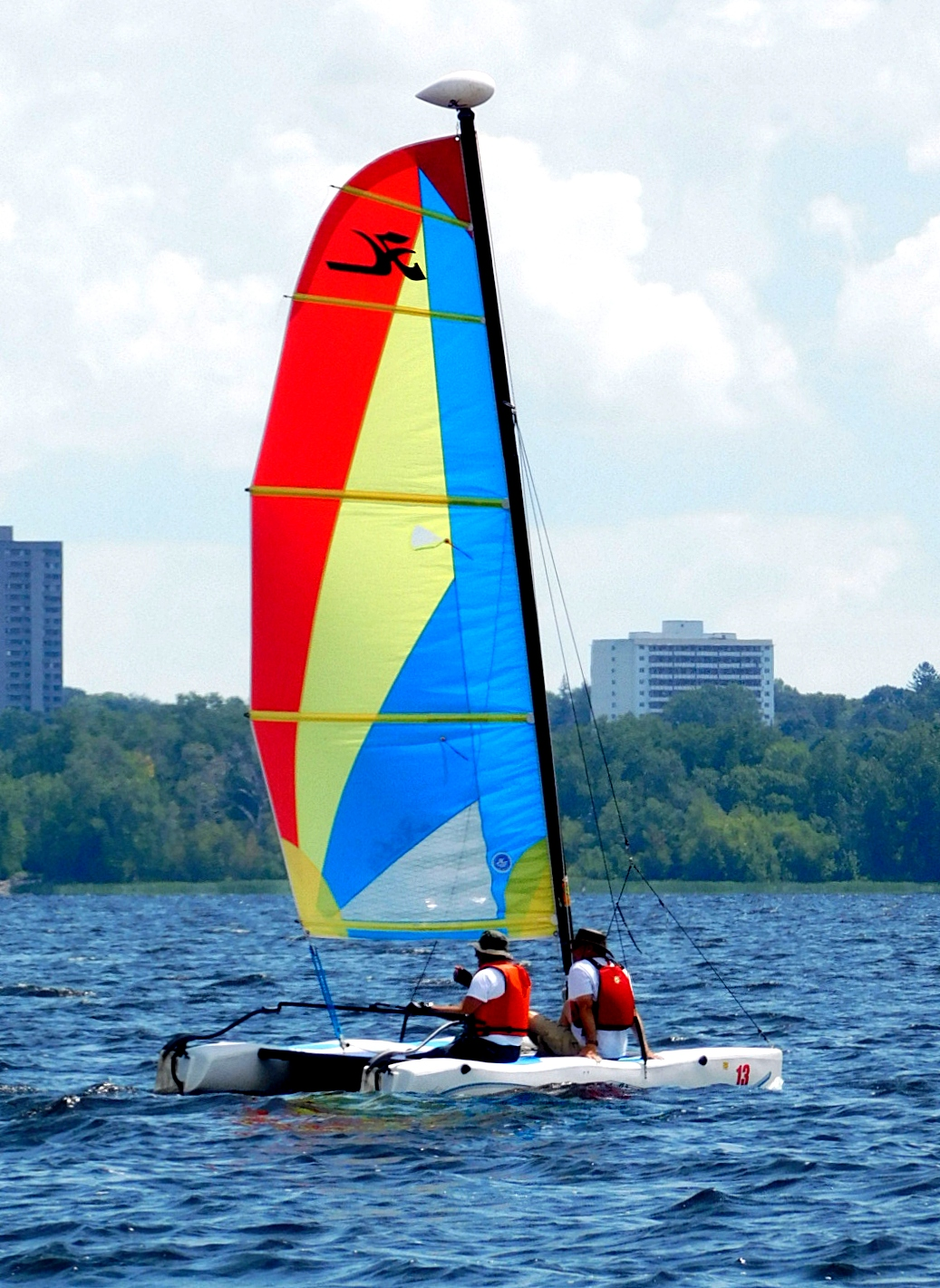

Development
- Designer: Gino Morrelli and Pete Melvin
- Location: United States
- Year: 1994 - Present
- Builder: Hobie Cat

Boat
- Displacement: 245 lb (111 kg)
- Draft: 1.74 ft (0.53 m)

Hull
- Type: catamaran
- Construction: Rotomolded Polyethylene
- LOA: 13.06 ft (3.98 m)
- LWL: 12.47 ft (3.80 m)
- Beam: 6.99 ft (2.13 m)
- Engine: none

Hull appendages
- Keel: none
- Ballast: none
- Rudder: transom-mounted rudder

Rig
- Rig type: Catboat

Sails
- Sailplan: cat rig
- Mainsail area: 95.00 sq ft (8.826 m^{2})
- Jib/genoa area: 24 sq ft (2.2 m^{2}) optional
- Total sail area: 95.00 sq ft (8.826 m^{2})

Racing
- D-PN: 92.1

The Hobie Wave is an American catamaran that was designed by Morrelli & Melvin and first built in 1994.

== Production ==
The design has been built by Hobie Cat in the United States since 1994 and is still in production as of 2024.

== Design ==
The Hobie Wave is a recreational sailboat, with its hulls made from rotomolded polyethylene and an aluminum mast. It has a catboat single sail rig, or, optionally a fractional sloop rig. The mainsail is fully battened and does not employ a boom. It has plumb stems, reverse transoms, transom-hung rudders controlled by a tiller and no keel. It displaces 245 lb (111 kg) and has a draft of 1.74 ft (0.53 m) with the rudders down and 0.92 ft (0.28 m) with the rudders up.

The boat has a capacity of four people.

A mast-top float to prevent the boat turning turtle is included as optional equipment.

The Wave has a D-PN of 92.1.

== Operational history ==
The design has proven popular at resorts, due to its rugged construction.

== Variants ==
Wave
Base catboat-rigged model designed for recreational use. Jib and spinnaker are factory options.
Wave Turbo
Model with jib kit.

=== Wave Spinnaker Kit ===
There has been considerable variation in the Hobie factory supplied spinnaker over the years with no 'stock' design being apparent.

Wave Club
Model designed for "schools, organizations or resorts". The Hobie Wave Club is distinguished from the Hobie Wave Classic by a 3-piece trampoline that inserts into boltrope tracks on the inboard edges of the port and starboard hulls. The sails, mast, and majority of the parts are the same between the Club and Classic models, with the shroud attachments and trampoline attachment methods differing between the two models.

=== Wave Classic ===
The Hobie Wave Classic was produced concurrently with the Hobie Wave Club and was designed to be quickly dis-assembled and re-assembled and featured hook and loop straps to fasten the aft end of the trampoline around the aft beam of the boat, a scissor clip style of shroud hook for a pin-less shroud connection, with the goal of being able to transport the boat via cartop. The Hobie Wave Classic uses a unique arrangement of wires down the port and starboard sides of the trampoline that pass through plastic tubes in the trampoline and through formed stainless steel hooks that are screwed to the polyethylene hulls.

=== Formula Wave ===
The Formula Wave Class emerged separate from most other Hobie racing classes and allowed non-Hobie branded sails in racing events. The series has grown over the years and has been successful.

== See also ==
- List of sailing boat types
