= Hobie Getaway =

Sailboat class

Getaway
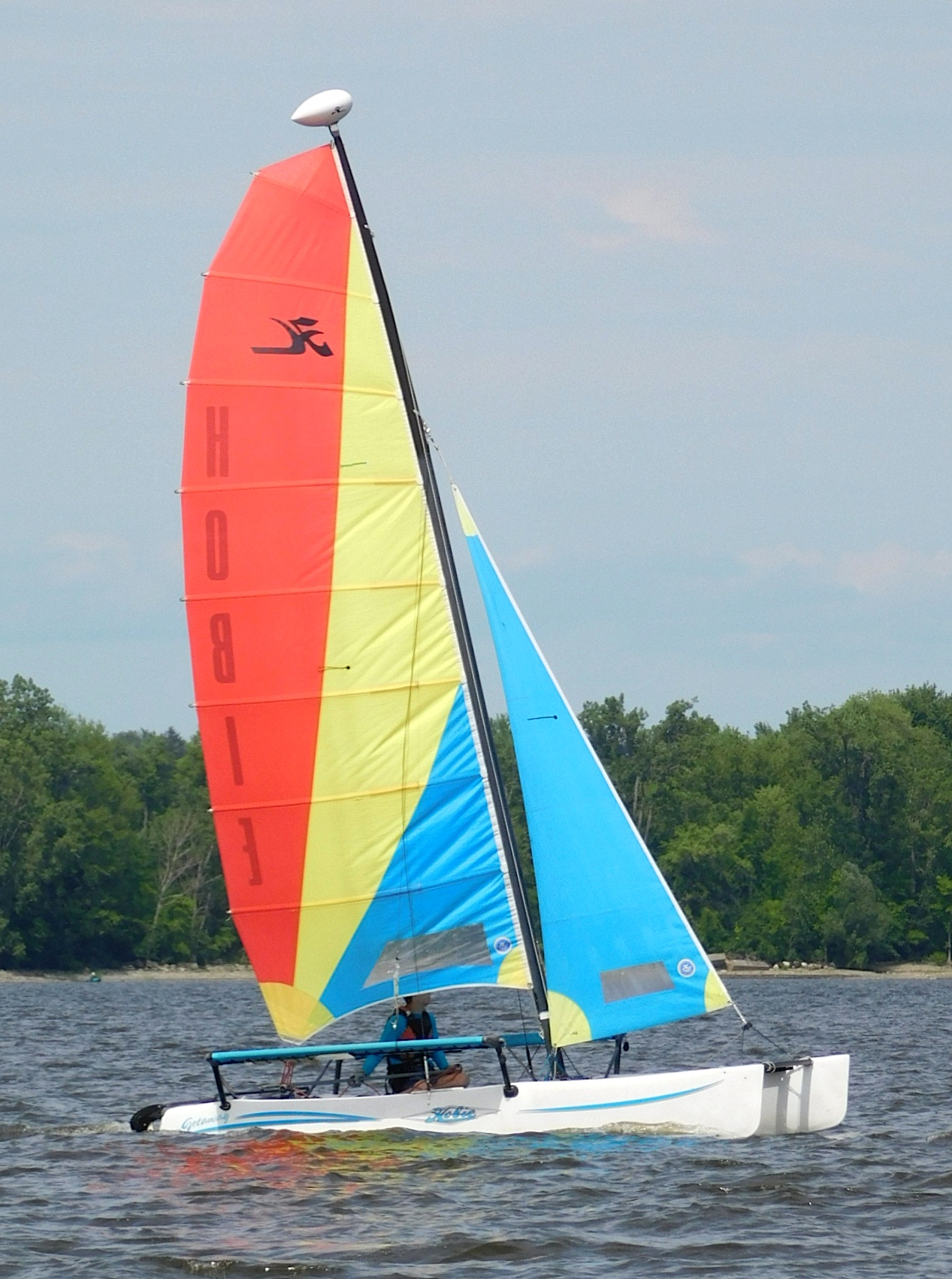

Development
- Designer: Hobie Cat
- Location: United States
- Year: 2001
- Builder: Hobie Cat
- Name: Getaway

Boat
- Displacement: 390 lb (177 kg)
- Draft: 0.70 ft (0.21 m)

Hull
- Type: Multihull
- Construction: Rotomolded Polyethylene
- LOA: 16.58 ft (5.05 m)
- Beam: 7.67 ft (2.34 m)
- Engine: none

Hull appendages
- Keel: none
- Ballast: none
- Rudders: dual, transom-mounted rudders

Rig
- General: Fractional rigged sloop

Sails
- Total sail area: 180 sq ft (17 m^{2})

The Hobie Getaway is an American catamaran sailboat, that was designed by Hobie Cat and first built in 2001.

== Production ==
The boat has built by Hobie Cat in the United States since 2001, and remained in production in 2021.

== Design ==
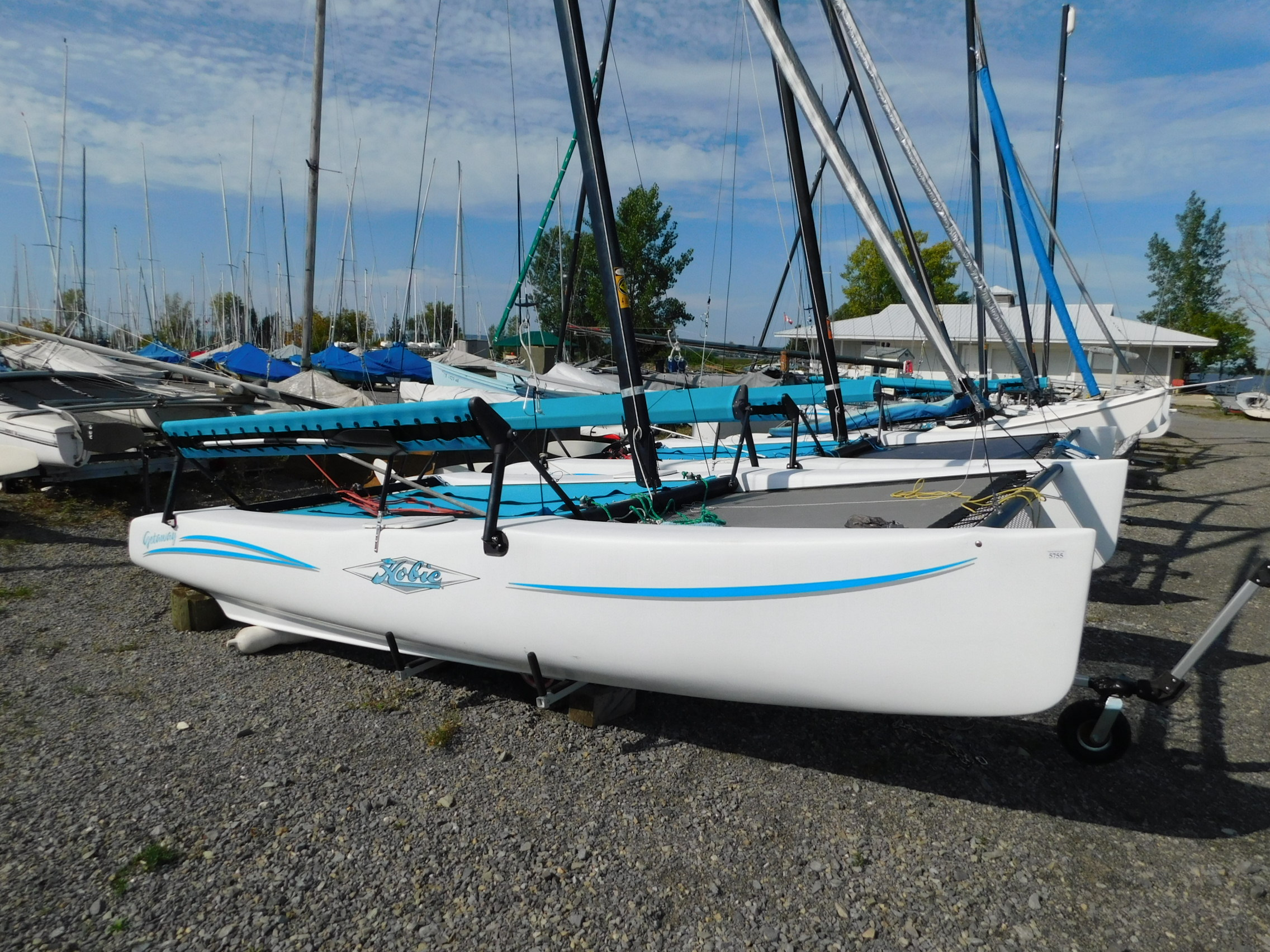
Hobie Getaway hull detail

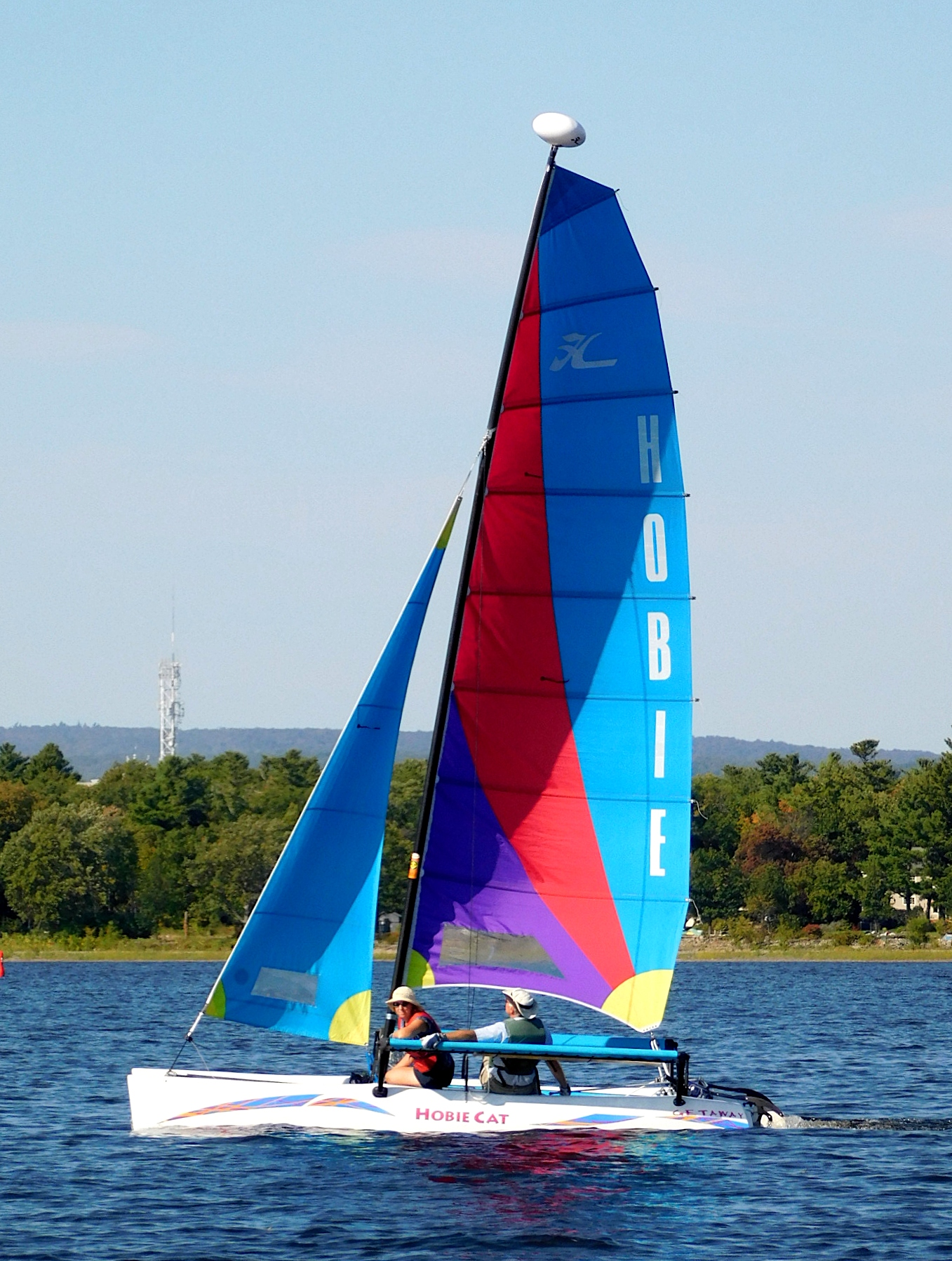
Hobie Getaway

The Getaway is a small recreational catamaran, with the dual hulls built of rotomolded polyethylene. It has a fractional sloop rig, including a roller furling jib and a full-batten mainsail, dual transom-hung rudders and no keel or daggerboards. It displaces 390 lb (177 kg) and can carry 1,000 lb (454 kg) of occupants.

A mast-top float to prevent the boat turning turtle is included as standard equipment. Wing seats for hiking out and trapezing from are optional. A trapeze is also optional.

The boat has a draft of 8.4 in (21 cm) with the rudders down and 3 in (7.6 cm) with rudders up.

The boat was redesigned in 2017 to give it a length overall of 17.00 ft (5.18 m), an increase from the original design 16.58 ft (5.05 m).

== See also ==
- List of sailing boat types
