= Terry Martin (surfer) =

Terry Martin (1937 – May 12, 2012) was a California surfer and surfboard shaper who worked for Hobie Surfboards, shaping more than 80,000 surfboards, including boards for surf legends such as Corky Carroll and Phil Edwards.

Martin grew up inland and was not exposed to surfing until later into his life. At the age of 14, his family moved to Point Loma. His first board was 13 feet (4.0 m) long and weighed 85 pounds (39 kg). At the time surfboards were over 80 pounds (36 kg), and tended to be very long.

Martin graduated from Point Loma high school. He served in the Air Force Reserves, and worked in construction, in shipbuilding, and as a door to door salesman. In 1963, he joined Hobie Alter in his Hobie Surf Shop.

The first board Martin created was a 10-foot (3.0 m) board made out of lighter balsa wood and redwood that he had salvaged from a lumber yard. This board weighed only 20 pounds (9.1 kg). It also had no fin, which allowed Martin to do tricks and moves that other surfers weren’t able to do.

Martin shaped an average of 10 boards a day. He was given the nickname “The Machine.” Over a span of six decades, he created around 80,000 surfboards. He created signature boards for Gary Propper, Corky Carroll, Gerry Lopez, Wayne "Rabbit" Bartholomew and Joyce Hoffman.

The last board he made was a 10-foot (3.0 m) balsa and redwood Hot Curl. This was a replica of the a board he had made when younger.

Martin died of melanoma on May 12, 2012.
