= Hobart Alter =

American businessman (1933–2014)

- Born: Hobart Laidlaw Alter; October 31, 1933; Ontario, California, U.S.
- Died: March 29, 2014 (aged 80); Palm Desert, California, U.S.
- Occupation: Sports equipment fabricator
- Spouse: Sharon Alter
- Children: 3

Hobart "Hobie" Laidlaw Alter (October 31, 1933 – March 29, 2014) was an American surf and sailing entrepreneur and pioneer, creator of the Hobie Cat catamarans, and founder of the Hobie company. He created the Hobie 33 ultralight-displacement sailboat and a mass-produced radio-controlled glider, the Hobie Hawk.

== Early life ==
Hobart Laidlaw Alter was born and raised in Ontario, California, but his family had a summer house in Laguna Beach, where Alter got into the full array of ocean sports.

== Career ==
=== Surfing and skateboarding business ===
During a summer vacation in 1950 Alter began by building 9-foot balsawood surfboards for his friends. He asked his dad to pull the DeSoto out of the family's Laguna Beach, California, garage, and converted the garage into a woodshop for his hobby. Initiated into surfing by Walter Hoffman, he started shaping balsa boards in the early 1950s. When the family's front yard became cluttered with the remnants of surfboard production in 1953, his father moved him off the property by buying him a lot on Pacific Coast Highway in nearby Dana Point for $1,500. Alter‘s hobby became a business and in discussing the future with friends as a young man "Hobie" declared that he wanted to make a living without having to wear hard-soled shoes or work east of California's Pacific Coast Highway by “making people a toy and giving them a game to play with it.” A couple of years later, Alter opened up Orange County's first surf shop in Dana Point, California. In February 1954, with the first stage of the shop completed, Hobie Surfboards opened its doors after a total investment of $12,000. "People laughed at me for setting up a surf shop," Alter remembered. "They said that once I'd sold a surfboard to each of the 250 surfers on the coast, I'd be out of business. But the orders just kept coming."

In 1958 Alter and Gordon "Grubby" Clark began experiments making surfboards out of foam and fiberglass. The new boards were lighter, faster, and more responsive than wooden ones. Several famous surfers surfed for the Hobie Team, including Joey Cabell, Phil Edwards, Corky Carroll, Gary Propper, Mickey Munoz, Joyce Hoffman and Yancy Spencer. Alter began making skateboards in 1962 and by 1964 he teamed up with the Vita Pakt juice company to create Hobie Skateboards. Alter went on to sponsor the Hobie Super Surfer skateboard team.

Alter hired other board-builders, including Phil Edwards and Reynolds Yater. With the introduction of foam-and-fiberglass technology, Alter brought Joe Quigg (surfer) over from Hawaii to help keep up with demand. Then came the high-volume production shapers like Ralph Parker and Terry Martin, guys who have shaped hundreds of thousands of surfboards over the years. Other Hobie shapers included Dewey Weber, Mickey Munoz, Corky Carroll, Don Hansen. Bruce Jones and the Patterson brothers.

After experimenting with foam for a couple of years, Alter made a breakthrough in 1958, finally achieving the right skin hardness for shapeability with the right core density for strength. He decided to set up a separate foam-blowing operation in nearby Laguna Canyon and recruited one of his glassers, Gordon "Grubby" Clark, to make polyurethane surfboard blanks. Almost immediately, the film Gidget was released, and surfing (and the demand for surfboards) boomed. "If that movie had come out in the balsa era," said Alter, "no one could have supplied them."

The new foam boards were called Speedo Sponges and Flexi-Fliers, and Hobie was soon manufacturing 250 a week. Clark eventually took over the foam operation, renaming it Clark Foam, and he serviced the lion's share of the world's surfboard blank market until abruptly shutting down the company in 2005.

=== Surfing ===
Alter was a surfing competitor in his younger days. He won the second Brooks Street contest in Laguna in 1954 and placed third and fourth at the Makaha International Surfing Championships in 1958 and 1959. He achieved success as a tandem surfer, placing second in the event at Makaha in 1962. Alter made the Guinness Book of World Records in 1964, surfing the wake of a motorboat 26 miles from Long Beach to Catalina Island.

=== Hobie Cat ===
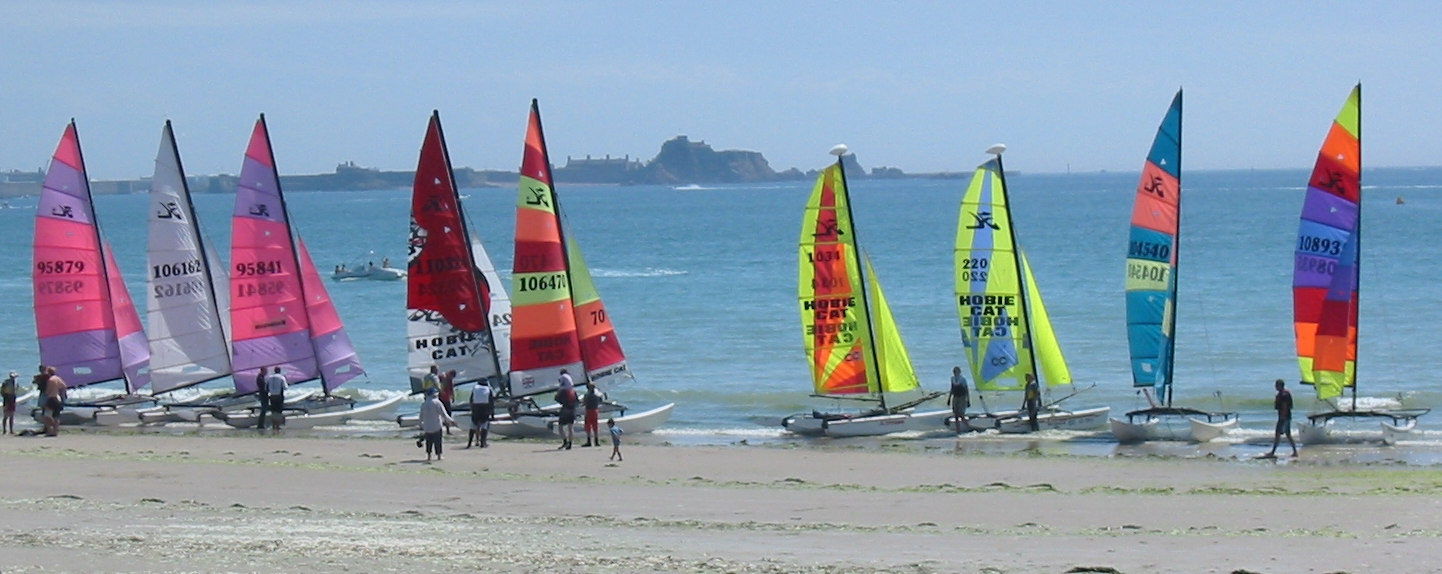
Hobie Cat catamarans on beach at Saint Helier, Jersey.

Alter's Hobie Cat became the nucleus of a successful worldwide catamaran business.

The company created 16 unique sailboats from the Hobie 10, once designed to compete with the Laser, to the Hobie 33, a 33-foot (10 m) monohull, lift-keel boat.

Alter sold Hobie Cat to the Coleman Company, Inc. in 1976, and his sons Hobie Jr. and Jeff carry on the family tradition, operating Hobie Designs and overseeing the company's licensing operations.

== Personal life ==
Before his death, Alter would divide his time between the mountains of Idaho (where he skied in the winter) and Orcas Island, the largest of the San Juan Islands in the Pacific Northwest, where he would anchor his 60-foot, foam-core, twin-Diesel power catamaran, that he designed and built for himself.

Alter married Susan. They had two sons and one daughter. He died of cancer in Palm Desert, California, on March 29, 2014, at the age of 80.

== Awards and honors ==
In 1983, Alter received the Golden Plate Award of the American Academy of Achievement.

Alter was inducted into the National Sailing Hall of Fame in 2011.

In 2018, the city of Dana Point honored Hobie Alter with a Hobie Alter Memorial in the form of a 27-foot high life-size cast bronze statue/sculpture titled "Hobie Riding the Wave of Success" by Bill Limebrook, which depicts Hobie Alter "hiking out" in his Hobie Cat 14. It was the inaugural feature of the city's Watermen's Plaza, followed by nine life-size statues/sculptures of famous Dana Point watersport athletes, filmmakers, artists, and entrepreneurs.
