= Rotational molding =

Making hollow plastic objects in a heated mold

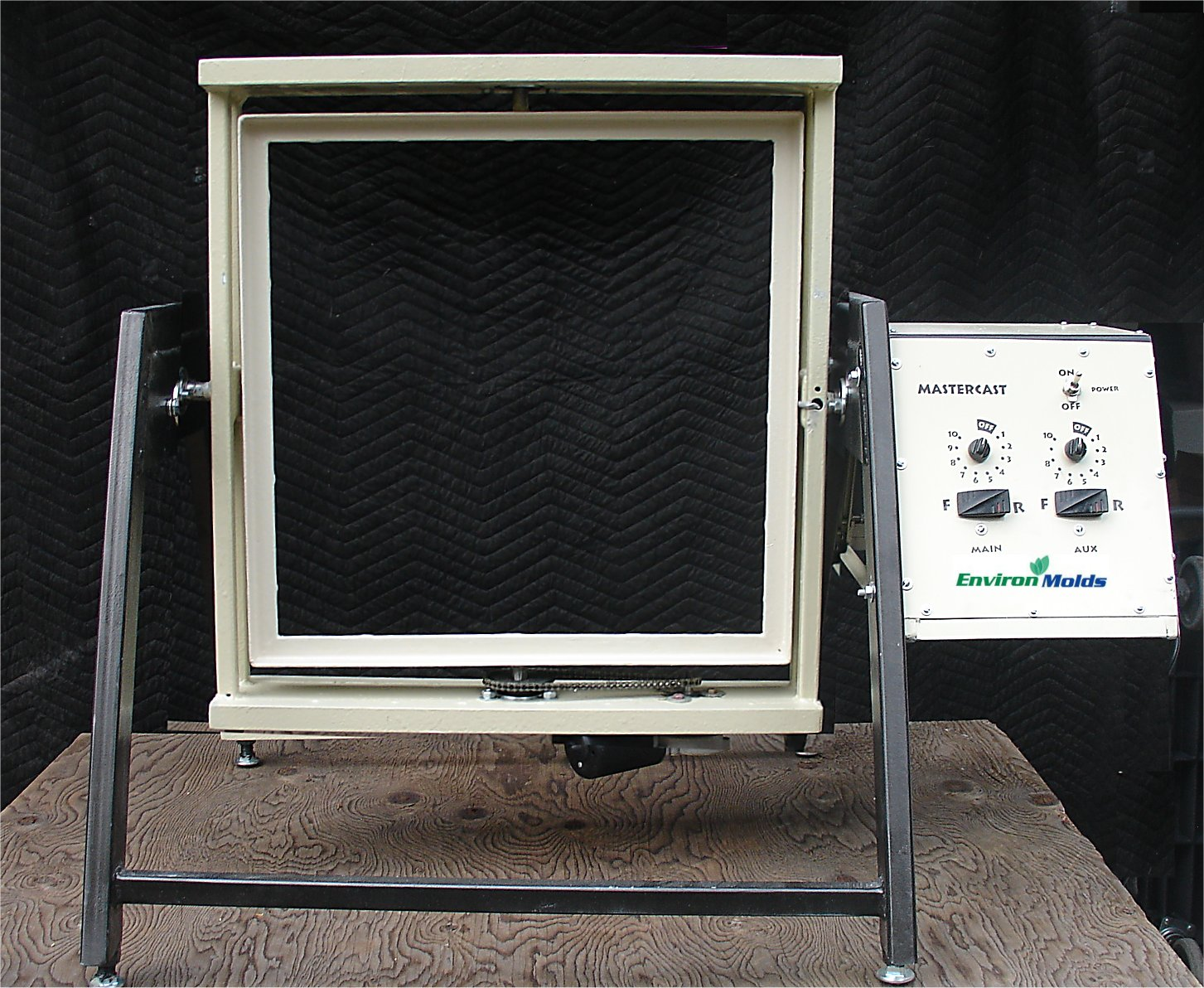
A three-motor powered (tri-power) rotational-molding or spin-casting machine

Rotational molding (BrE: moulding) involves a heated mold which is filled with a charge or shot weight of the material. It is then slowly rotated (usually around two perpendicular axes), causing the softened material to disperse and stick to the walls of the mold forming a hollow part. In order to form an even thickness throughout the part, the mold rotates at all times during the heating phase, and then continues to rotate during the cooling phase to avoid sagging or deformation. The process was applied to plastics in the 1950s but in the early years was little used because it was a slow process restricted to a small number of plastics. Over time, improvements in process control and developments with plastic powders have resulted in increased use.

Rotocasting (also known as rotacasting), by comparison, uses self-curing or UV-curable resins (as opposed to thermoplastics) in an unheated mold, but shares slow rotational speeds in common with rotational molding. This kind of rotocasting should not be confused with centrifugal casting.

== History ==
In 1855 a patent taken out by R. Peters in Britain documented the first use of a rotating mechanism producing "two centrifugal motions at right angles to each other" by means of beveled gearing, and heat. This rotational molding process was used to create artillery shells and other hollow vessels, the main purpose of which was to create consistency in wall thickness and density. In a U.S. patent in 1905, F.A. Voelke described a method including a polymer for the production of articles using paraffin wax. Development led to G.S. Baker's and G.W. Perks' process of producing hollow chocolate Easter eggs in 1910. Rotational molding had developed further when R.J. Powell made mention of the commonly used ratio of 4:1 between major and minor axes of rotation at slow rotation speeds. His patent covered this process for molding hollow objects from plaster of Paris in the 1920s. These early methods using different materials directed the advances in the way rotational molding is used today with plastics.

Plastics were introduced to the rotational molding process in the early 1950s. One of the first applications was to manufacture doll heads. The machinery was made of an E Blue box-oven machine, inspired by a General Motors rear axle, powered by an external electric motor and heated by floor-mounted gas burners. The mold was made of electroformed nickel-copper and the plastic was a liquid polyvinyl chloride (PVC) plastisol. The cooling method consisted of placing the mold into cold water. This process of rotational molding led to the creation of other plastic toys. As demand for and popularity of this process increased, it was used to create other products such as road cones, marine buoys, and car armrests. This popularity led to the development of larger machinery. A new system of heating was also created, going from the original direct gas jets to the current indirect high velocity air system. In Europe during the 1960s the Engel process was developed. This allowed large hollow containers to be manufactured in low-density polyethylene. The cooling method consisted of turning off the burners and allowing the plastic to harden while still rocking in the mold.

In 1976, the Association of Rotational Molders (ARM) was founded in Chicago as a worldwide trade association. The main objective of this association is to increase awareness of the rotational molding technology and process.

In the 1980s, new plastics, such as polycarbonate, polyester, and nylon, were introduced to rotational molding. This has led to new uses for this process, such as the creation of fuel tanks and industrial moldings. The research that has been done since the late 1980s at Queen's University Belfast has led to the development of more precise monitoring and control of the cooling processes based on their development of the "Rotolog system".

== Equipment and tooling ==
Rotational molding machines are made in a wide range of sizes. They normally consist of molds, an oven, a cooling chamber, and mold spindles. The spindles are mounted on a rotating axis, which provides a uniform coating of the plastic inside each mold.

Molds (or tooling) are either fabricated from welded sheet steel or cast. The fabrication method is often driven by part size and complexity; most intricate parts are likely made with cast tooling. Molds are typically manufactured from stainless steel or aluminum. Aluminum molds are usually much thicker than equivalent steel molds, as it is a softer metal. This thickness does not much affect cycle times because aluminum's thermal conductivity is many times greater than steel's. Owing to the need to develop a model prior to casting, cast molds tend to have additional costs associated with the manufacturing of the tooling, whereas fabricated steel or aluminum molds, particularly when used for less complex parts, are less expensive. However, some molds contain both aluminum and steel. This allows for variable thicknesses in the walls of the product. While this process is not as precise as injection molding, it does provide the designer with more options. The aluminum addition to the steel provides more heat capacity, causing the melt-flow to stay in a fluid state for a longer period.

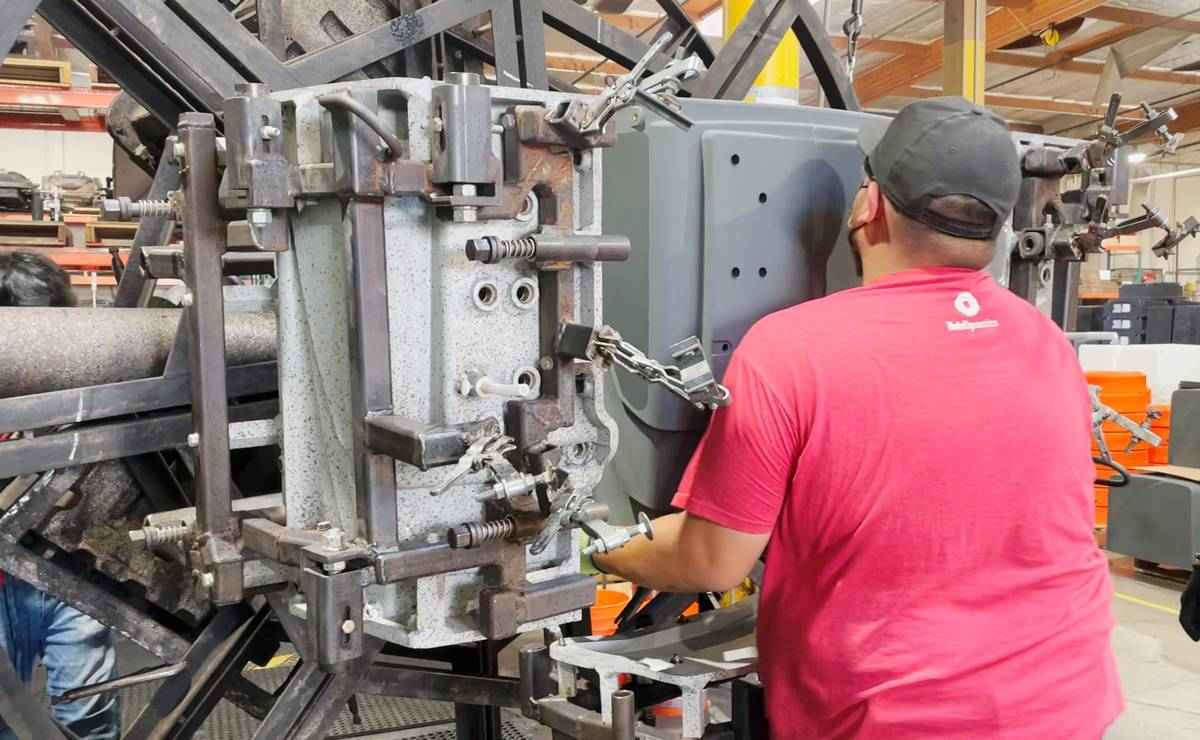
Demold process of a plastic part from a rotational molding tool.

=== Standard setup and equipment for rotational molding ===
Normally all rotation molding systems include molds, oven, cooling chamber and mold spindles. The molds are used to create the part, and are typically made of aluminium. The quality and finish of the product is directly related to the quality of the mold being used. The oven is used to heat the part while also rotating the part to form it as desired. The cooling chamber is where the part is placed until it cools, and the spindles are mounted to rotate and provide a uniform coat of plastic inside each mold.

=== Rotational molding machines ===
==== Rock and roll machine ====
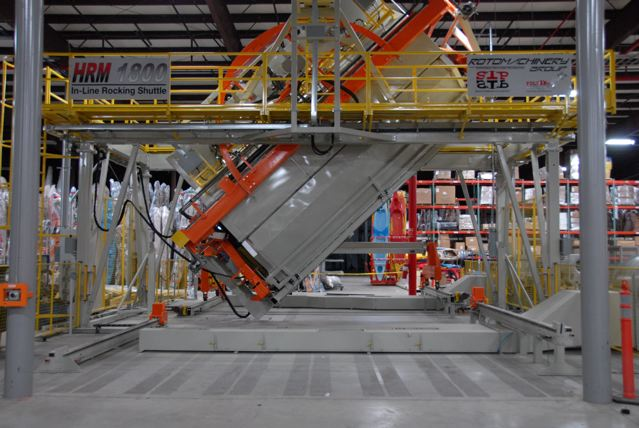
A rock and roll rotational molding machine built in 2009

This is a specialized machine designed mainly to produce long, narrow parts. Some are of the clamshell type, having one arm, but there are also shuttle-type rock and roll machines, with two arms. Each arm rotates or rolls the mold 360 degrees in one direction and at the same time tips and rocks the mold 45 degrees above or below horizontal in the other direction. Newer machines use forced hot air to heat the mold. These machines are best for large parts that have a large length-to-width ratio. Because of the smaller heating chambers, there is a saving in heating costs compared to biaxial machines.

==== Clamshell machine ====
This is a single-arm rotational molding machine. The arm is usually supported by other arms on both ends. The clamshell machine heats and cools the mold in the same chamber. It takes up less space than equivalent shuttle and swing arm rotational molders. It is low in cost compared to the size of products made. It is available in smaller scales for schools interested in prototyping and for high quality models. More than one mold can be attached to the single arm.

==== Vertical or up & over rotational machine ====
The loading and unloading area is at the front of the machine between the heating and cooling areas. These machines vary in size between small to medium compared to other rotational machines. Vertical rotational molding machines are energy-efficient, owing to the compactness of their heating and cooling chambers. These machines have the same (or similar) capabilities as the horizontal carousel multi-arm machines, but take up much less space.

==== Shuttle machine ====
Most shuttle machines have two arms that move the molds back and forth between the heating chamber and cooling station. The arms are independent of each other and they turn the molds biaxially. In some cases, the shuttle machine has only one arm. This machine moves the mold in a linear direction in and out of heating and cooling chambers. It is low in cost for the size of product produced and the footprint is kept to a minimum compared to other types of machines. It is also available in smaller scale for schools and prototyping.

==== Swing arm machine ====
The swing-arm machine can have up to four arms, with a biaxial movement. Each arm is independent from each other as it is not necessary to operate all arms at the same time. Each arm is mounted on a corner of the oven and swings in and out of the oven. On some swing-arm machines, a pair of arms is mounted on the same corner, so that a four-arm machine has two pivot points. These machines are very useful for companies that have long cooling cycles or require a lot of time to demold parts, compared to the cook time. It is much easier to schedule maintenance work or try to run a new mold without interrupting production on the other arms of the machine.

==== Carousel machine ====
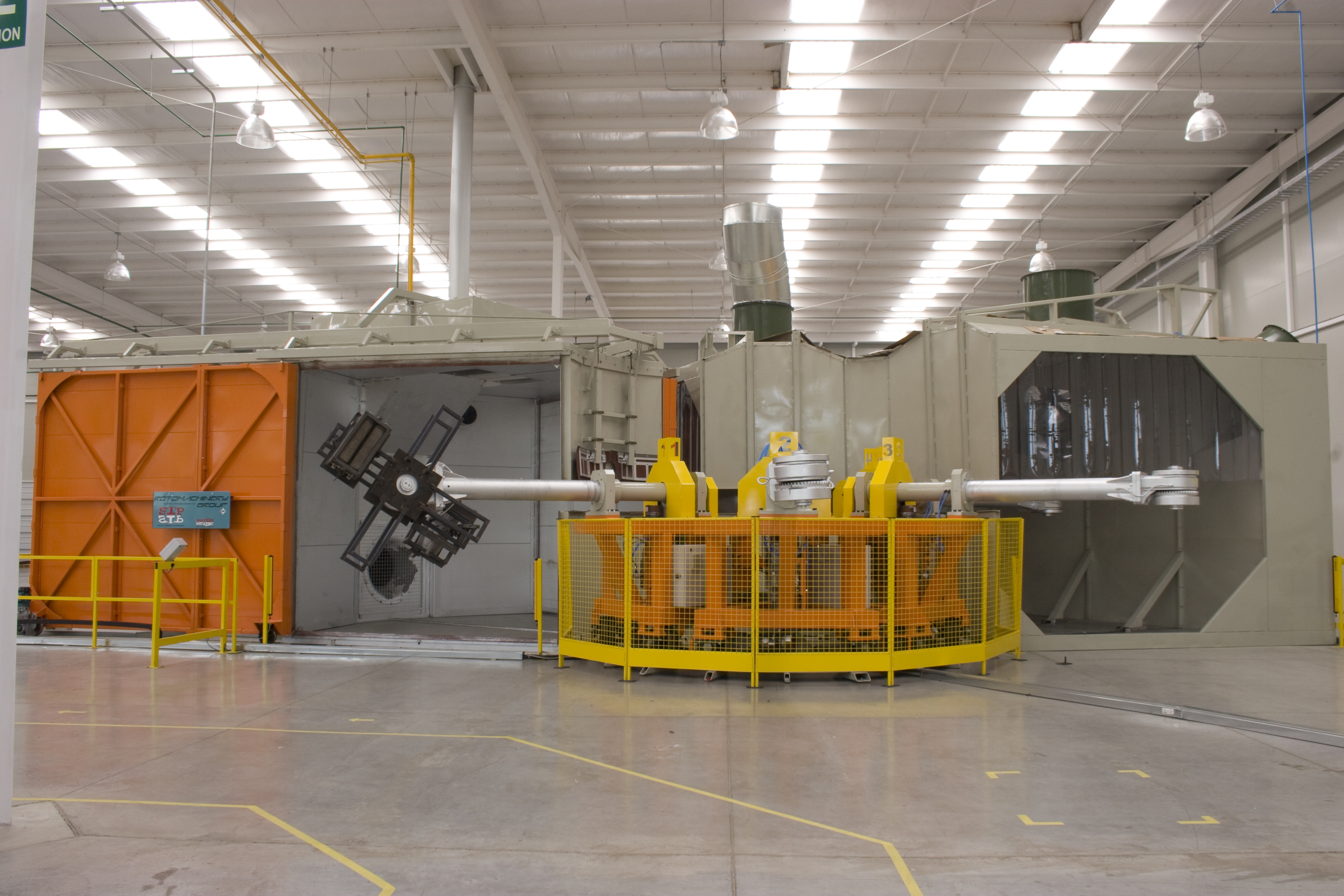
A carousel machine with four independent arms

This is one of the most common biaxial machines in the industry. It can have up to four arms and six stations and comes in a wide range of sizes. The machine comes in two different models, fixed and independent. A fixed-arm carousel consists of three fixed arms that must move together. One arm will be in the heating chamber while another is in the cooling chamber and the third in the loading/reloading area. The fixed-arm carousel works well when identical cycle times are used for each arm. The independent-arm carousel machine is available with three or four arms that can move independently. This allows for different-size molds, with different cycle times and thickness needs.

== Production process ==
The rotational molding process is a high-temperature, low-pressure plastic-forming process that uses heat and biaxial rotation (i.e., angular rotation on two axes) to produce hollow, one-piece parts. Critics of the process point to its long cycle times—only one or two cycles an hour can typically occur, as opposed to other processes such as injection molding, where parts can be made in a few seconds. The process does have distinct advantages. Manufacturing large, hollow parts such as oil tanks is much easier by rotational molding than any other method. Rotational molds are much cheaper than other types of mold. Very little material is wasted using this process, and excess material can often be reused, making it a very economically and environmentally viable manufacturing process.

Rotational Molding Process

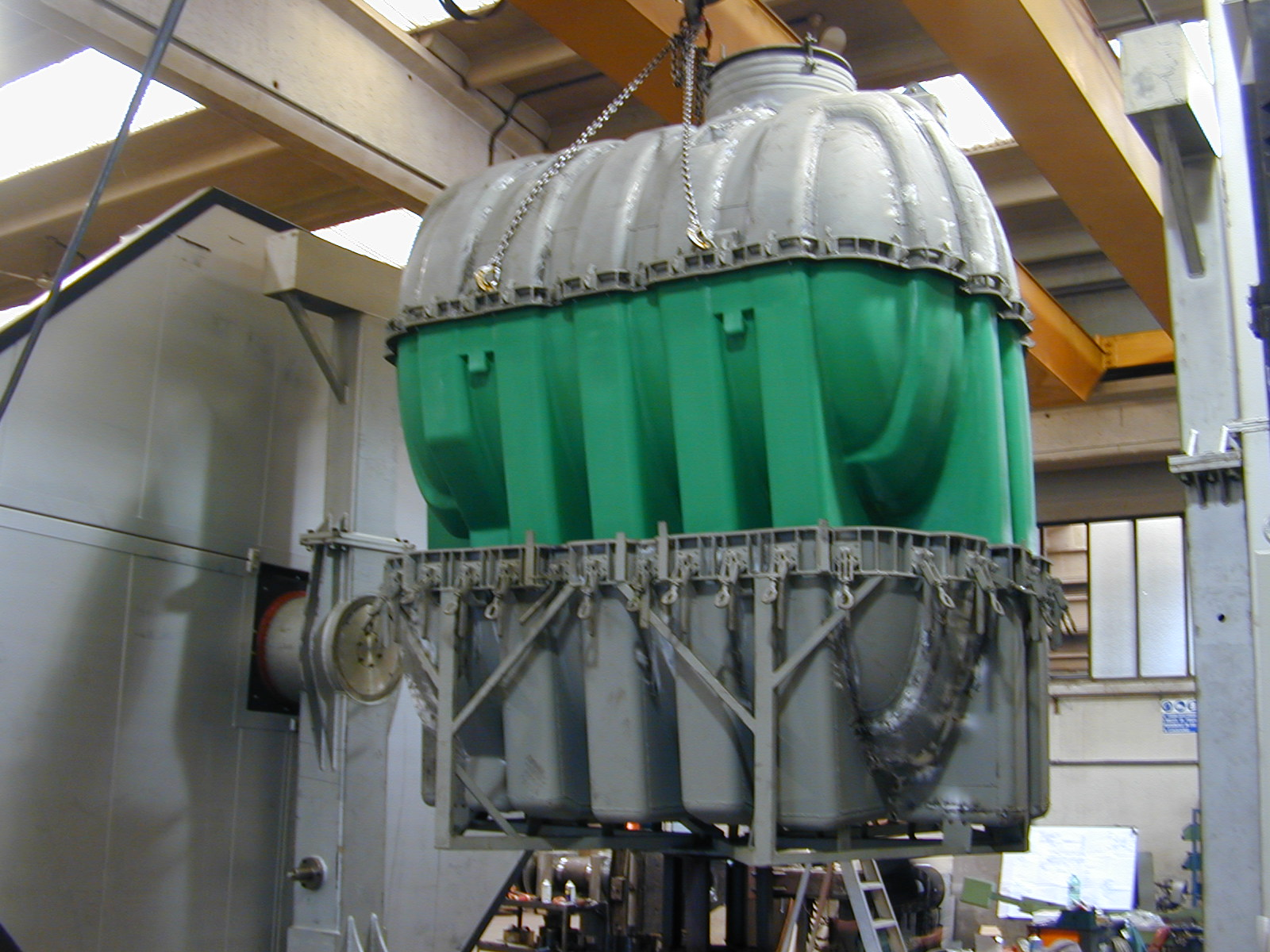
Unloading a molded polyethylene tank in a shuttle machine

Rotational molding process

The rotational molding process consists of four distinct phases:

1. Loading a measured quantity of polymer (usually in powder form) into the mold.
2. Heating the mold in an oven while it rotates, until all the polymer has melted and adhered to the mold wall. The hollow part should be rotated through two or more axes, rotating at different speeds, in order to avoid the accumulation of polymer powder. The length of time the mold spends in the oven is critical: too long and the polymer will degrade, reducing impact strength. If the mold spends too little time in the oven, the polymer melt may be incomplete. The polymer grains will not have time to fully melt and coalesce on the mold wall, resulting in large bubbles in the polymer. This impairs the mechanical properties of the finished product.
3. Cooling the mold, usually by fan. This stage of the cycle can be quite lengthy. The polymer must be cooled so that it solidifies and can be handled safely by the operator. This typically takes tens of minutes. The part will shrink on cooling, coming away from the mold, and facilitating easy removal of the part. The cooling rate must be kept within a certain range. Very rapid cooling (for example, water spray) would result in cooling and shrinking at an uncontrolled rate, producing a warped part.
4. Removal of the part.

=== Recent improvements ===
Until recently, the process largely relied on both trial and error and the experience of the operator to determine when the part should be removed from the oven and when it was cool enough to be removed from the mold. Technology has improved in recent years, allowing the air temperature in the mold to be monitored and removing much of the guesswork from the process.

Much current research is into reducing the cycle time, as well as improving part quality. The most promising area is in mold pressurization. It is well known that applying a small amount of pressure internally to the mold at the correct point in the heating phase accelerates coalescence of the polymer particles during the melting, producing a part with fewer bubbles in less time than at atmospheric pressure. This pressure delays the separation of the part from the mold wall due to shrinkage during the cooling phase, aiding cooling of the part. The main drawback to this is the danger to the operator of explosion of a pressurized part. This has prevented adoption of mold pressurization on a large scale by rotomolding manufacturers.

== Mold release agents ==
A good mold release agent (MRA) will allow the material to be removed quickly and effectively. Mold releases can reduce cycle times, defects, and browning of finished product. There are a number of mold release types available; they can be categorized as follows:

- Sacrificial coatings: the coating of MRA has to be applied each time because most of the MRA comes off on the molded part when it releases from the tool. Silicones are typical MRA compounds in this category.
- Semi-permanent coatings: the coating, if applied correctly, will last for multiple releases before requiring to be reapplied or touched up. This type of coating is most prevalent in today's rotational molding industry. The active chemistry involved in these coatings is typically a polysiloxane.
- Permanent coatings: most often some form of polytetrafluoroethylene (PTFE) coating, which is applied to the mold. Permanent coatings avoid the need for operator application, but may become damaged by misuse.

== Materials ==
More than 80% of all the material used is from the polyethylene family: crosslinked polyethylene (PEX), low-density polyethylene (LDPE), linear low-density polyethylene (LLDPE), high-density polyethylene (HDPE), and regrind. Other compounds are polyvinyl chloride (PVC) plastisols, nylons, and polypropylene.

Order of materials most commonly used by industry:

- Polyethylene
- Polypropylene
- Polyvinyl chloride
- Nylon
- Polycarbonate

These materials are also occasionally used (not in order of most used):

- Aluminum
- Acrylonitrile butadiene styrene (ABS)
- Acetal
- Acrylic
- Epoxy
- Fluorocarbons
- Ionomer
- Polybutylene
- Polyester
- Polystyrene
- Polyurethane
- Silicone
- Various foods (especially chocolate)

=== Natural materials ===
Recently it has become possible to use natural materials in the molding process. Through the use of real sands and stone chip, sandstone composite can be created which is 80% natural non-processed material.

Rotational molding of plaster is used to produce hollow statuettes.

Chocolate is rotationally molded to form hollow treats.

== Products ==
Designers can select the best material for their application, including materials that meet U.S. Food and Drug Administration (FDA) requirements. Additives for weather resistance, flame retardation, or static elimination can be incorporated. Inserts, graphics, threads, handles, minor undercuts, flat surfaces without draft angles, or fine surface detail can be part of the design. Designs can also be multi-wall, either hollow or foam filled.

Products that can be manufactured using rotational molding include storage tanks, furniture, road signs and bollards, planters, pet houses, toys, bins and refuse containers, doll parts, road cones, footballs, helmets, canoes, rowing boats, tornado shelters, kayak hulls, underground cellars for vine and vegetables storage and playground slides. The process is also used to make highly specialised products, including UN-approved containers for the transportation of nuclear fissile materials, anti-piracy ship protectors, seals for inflatable oxygen masks and lightweight components for the aerospace industry.

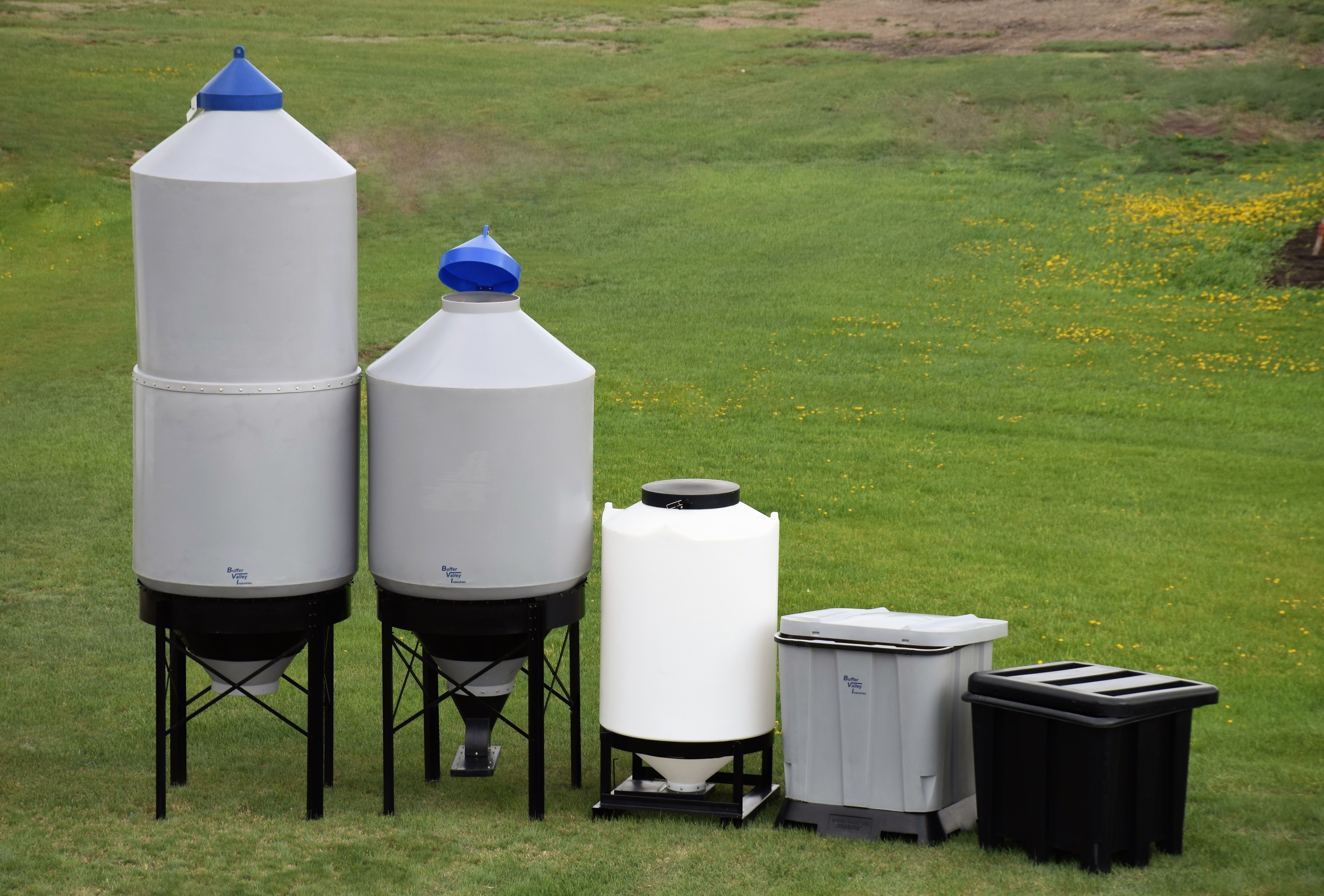
Plastic grain bins made by Buffer Valley Industries

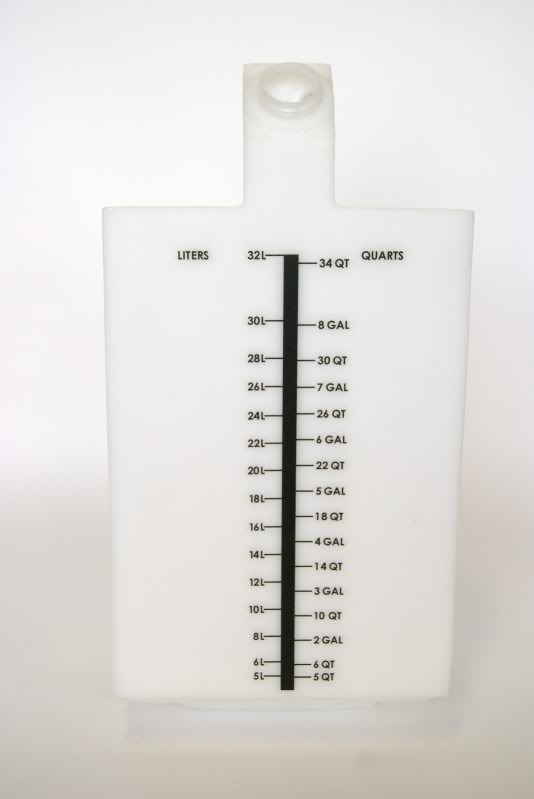
Mold in graphic

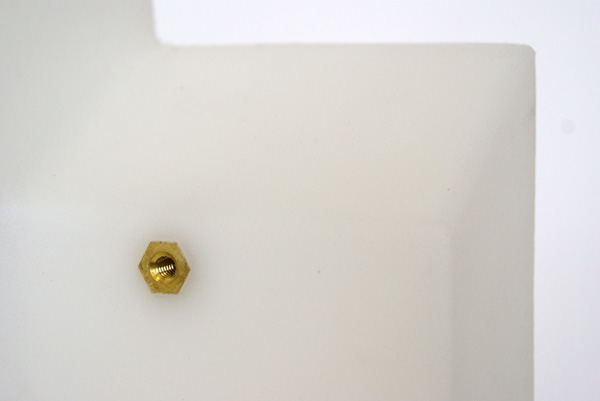
A blind brass threaded hex insert molded into a liquid storage tank.

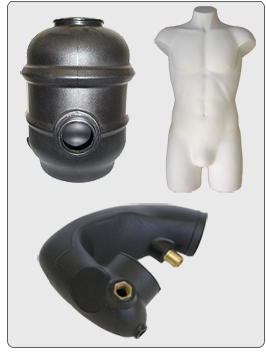

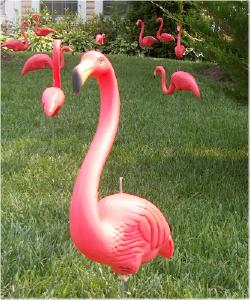
Rotational Molded Flamingo

Edon roto molded rowing boat

== Design considerations ==
=== Designing for rotational molding ===
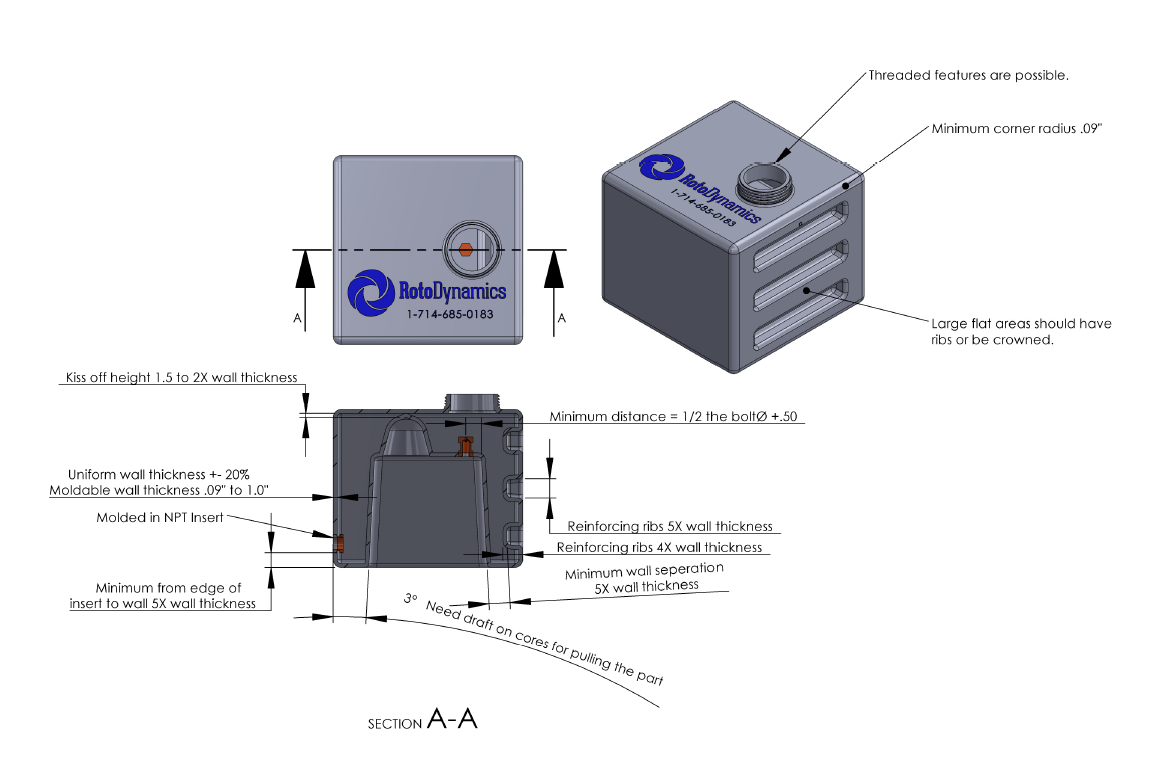
Design Guideline for Rotational Molding

Another consideration is in the draft angles. These are required to remove the piece from the mold. On the outside walls, a draft angle of 1° may work (assuming no rough surface or holes). On inside walls, such as the inside of a boat hull, a draft angle of 5° may be required. This is due to shrinkage and possible part warping.

Another consideration is of structural support ribs. While solid ribs may be desirable and achievable in injection molding and other processes, a hollow rib is the best solution in rotational molding. A solid rib may be achieved by inserting a finished piece in the mold, but this adds cost.

Rotational molding excels at producing hollow parts. However, care must be taken when this is done. When the depth of the recess is greater than the width there may be problems with even heating and cooling. Additionally, enough room must be left between the parallel walls to allow for the melt-flow to move properly throughout the mold. Otherwise webbing may occur. A desirable parallel wall scenario would have a gap at least three times the nominal wall thickness, with five times the nominal wall thickness being optimal. Sharp corners for parallel walls must also be considered. With angles of less than 45° bridging, webbing, and voids may occur.

=== Material limitations and considerations ===
Another consideration is the melt-flow of materials. Certain materials, such as nylon, will require larger radii than other materials. The stiffness of the set material may be a factor. More structural and strengthening measures may be required when a flimsy material is used.

=== Wall thickness ===
One benefit of rotational molding is the ability to experiment, particularly with wall thicknesses. Cost is entirely dependent on wall thickness, with thicker walls being costlier and more time-consuming to produce. While the wall can have nearly any thickness, designers must remember that the thicker the wall, the more material and time will be required, increasing costs. In some cases, the plastics may degrade owing to extended periods at high temperature. Different materials have different thermal conductivity, meaning they require different times in the heating chamber and cooling chamber. Ideally, the part will be tested to use the minimum thickness required for the application. This minimum will then be established as a nominal thickness.

For the designer, while variable thicknesses are possible, a process called stop rotation is required. This process is limited in that only one side of the mold may be thicker than the others. After the mold is rotated and all the surfaces are sufficiently coated with the melt-flow, the rotation stops and the melt-flow is allowed to pool at the bottom of the mold cavity.

Wall thickness is important for corner radii as well. Large outside radii are preferable to small radii. Large inside radii are also preferable to small inside radii. This allows for a more even flow of material and a more even wall thickness. However, an outside corner is generally stronger than an inside corner.

== Process: advantages, limitations, and material requirements ==
=== Advantages ===
Rotational molding offers design advantages over other molding processes. With proper design, parts assembled from several pieces can be molded as one part, eliminating high fabrication costs. The process also has inherent design strengths, such as consistent wall thickness and strong outside corners that are virtually stress-free. For additional strength, reinforcing ribs can be designed into the part. Along with being designed into the part, they can be added to the mold.

The ability to add prefinished pieces to the mold alone is a large advantage. Metal threads, internal pipes and structures, and even different colored plastics can all be added to the mold prior to the addition of plastic pellets. However, care must be taken to ensure that minimal shrinkage while cooling will not damage the part. This shrinking allows for mild undercuts and negates the need for ejection mechanisms (for most pieces).

Rotational molding can be used as a feasible alternative to blow molding with products such as plastic bottles and cylindrical containers. This substitution is efficient on only a smaller scale, as blow-molding's efficiency depends on large runs.

Another advantage lies in the molds themselves. Since they require less tooling, they can be manufactured and put into production much more quickly than other molding processes. This is especially true for complex parts, which may require large amounts of tooling for other molding processes. Rotational molding is also the process of choice for short runs and rush deliveries. The molds can be swapped quickly or different colors can be used without purging the mold. With other processes, purging may be required to swap colors.

Due to the uniform thicknesses achieved, large stretched sections are nonexistent, which makes large thin panels possible (although warping may occur). Also, there is little flow of plastic (stretching) but rather a placing of the material within the part. These thin walls also limit cost and production time.

Another cost advantage with rotational molding is the minimal amount of material wasted in production. There are no sprues or runners (as in injection molding), and no off-cuts or pinch-off scrap (as in blow molding). What material is wasted, as scrap or from failed part testing, can usually be recycled.

=== Limitations ===
Rotation-molded parts are subject to restrictions that are different from those of other plastic processes. As it is a low-pressure process, sometimes designers face hard-to-reach areas in the mold. Good-quality powder may help overcome some situations, but usually the designers have to keep in mind that it is not possible to make sharp threads that would be possible with injection molding. Some products based on polyethylene can be put in the mold before it is charged with the main material. This can help to avoid holes that otherwise would appear in some areas. This could also be achieved using molds with movable sections.

Another limitation lies in the molds themselves. Unlike other processes in which only the product needs to be cooled before being removed, with rotational molding the entire mold must be cooled. While water-cooling processes are possible, there is still a large down time of the mold, increasing both financial and environmental costs. Some plastics will degrade with the long heating cycles or in the process of turning them into a powder to be melted.

The stages of heating and cooling involve transfer of heat first from the hot medium to the polymer material and next from it to the cooling environment. In both cases, the process of heat transfer occurs in an unsteady regime; therefore, its kinetics attracts the greatest interest in considering these steps. In the heating stage, the heat taken from the hot gas is absorbed both by the mold and the polymer material. The rig for rotational molding usually has a relatively small wall thickness and is manufactured from metals with a high thermal conductivity (aluminum, steel). As a rule, the mold transfers much more heat than plastic can absorb; therefore, the mold temperature must vary linearly. The rotational velocity in rotational molding is rather low (4 to 20 rpm). As a result, in the first stages of the heating cycle, the charged material remains as a powder layer at the bottom of the mold. The most convenient way of changing the cycle is by applying PU sheets in hot rolled forms.

=== Material requirements ===
Owing to the nature of the process, materials selection must take into account the following:

- Owing to high temperatures within the mold, the plastic must have a high resistance to permanent change in properties caused by heat (high thermal stability).
- The molten plastic will come into contact with the oxygen inside the mold. This can potentially lead to oxidation of the melted plastic and deterioration of the material's properties. For this reason, the chosen plastic must have a sufficient number of antioxidant molecules to prevent such degradation in its liquid state.
- Because there is no pressure to push the plastic into the mold, the chosen plastic must be able to flow easily through the cavities of the mold. The part's design must also take into account the flow characteristics of the particular plastic chosen.

== See also ==
- Spin casting – Method of utilizing centrifugal force to produce castings from a rubber mold
