= Phil Edwards (surfer) =

American surfer

Philip (Phil) Edwards (born June 10, 1938) is an American surfer from Oceanside, California. He is credited with being the first to surf the Banzai pipeline in Hawaii, being the first professional surfer, and creating the first signature surf board. He was the subject of a cover story, and his photo appeared on the cover of Sports Illustrated in 1966. Edwards was also featured prominently in the Bruce Brown films The Endless Summer and before that Surfing Hollow Days which featured the first film footage of Pipeline. He is also credited to have said "The best surfer is that one, who is having more fun in the water!"

== Honors ==
A life-size cast bronze statue of Phil Edwards by William Limebrook was unveiled June 7, 2019 at Watermen's Plaza, Dana Point, California. It was the third of ten life-size cast bronze statues of famous Dana Point and watersport athletes, surfers, filmmakers, artists, and entrepreneurs.
