= List of surfers =

This is a list of people associated with surfing or surf culture.

== A ==
- Reno Abellira (1950– ) (Haw) Smirnoff World Pro/Am winner in 1974
- Megan Abubo (1978– ) (Haw)
- Eddie Aikau (1946–1978) (Haw) Award-winning surfer and lifeguard
- Lisa Andersen (1969– ) (USA) Four-time world surfing champion 1994–1997
- Simon Anderson (1954– ) (Aus) First advocate of the three-finned surfboard, the "thruster," early 1980s
- Bill Andrews (1944–2017) (USA) Among first to surf Black's Beach in La Jolla, California
- Robert August (1945– ) (USA) Surfer and Surfboard Designer
- Rolf Aurness (1952– ) (USA) 1970 World Champion

== B ==
- Tim Baker (Aus) Journalist, former editor of Tracks and Australia's Surfing Life magazines.
- Christian Bailey (1981– ) (USA) Paraplegic surfer, Team USA Captain
- Rochelle Ballard (1971– ) (Haw)
- John Heath Ball (1907–2001) (USA)
- Wayne Bartholomew (Aus) 1978 World Champion
- Layne Beachley (1972– ) (Aus) Seven time ASP World Champion, founder of 'Aim For The Stars'
- Holly Beck (1980– ) (USA) 2000 Explorer Women's Western Surfing Champion, 2000 College Women's National title
- Linda Benson (1944– ) (USA) 1959 Makaha International Champion, U.S. Champion: 1959, 1960, 1961, 1964, 1968
- Shane Beschen (1972– ) (Haw)
- Ray Bisschop (1970– ) (Aus) Publisher of Australia's Surfing Life and presenter of Surfing Life TV
- Jesse Brad Billauer (1979– ) (USA) Quadriplegic surfer
- Tom Blake (1902–1994) (USA) Early American Surfer, inventor of the Skeg
- Alana Blanchard (USA) (1990– ) Women's Pipeline Championship winner
- Jimmy Blears (1948–2011) (Haw) 1972 World Champion
- Wendy Botha (1965– ) (Aus) Four-time world surfing champion
- Lynne Boyer (1956– ) (USA) Two-time world surfing champion 1978 and 1979
- Ken Bradshaw (1952– ) (USA) North Shore hellman
- Bruce Brown (1937–2017) San Francisco. Surfing film maker
- Chris Brown (1970–2019) Carpinteria, California, PSAA Champion in 1994
- Bud Browne (1912–2008) (USA) Pioneer surf film maker, the first filmmaker to show surf movies commercially
- Pam Burridge (1965– ) (Aus) 1990 women's world champion
- Taj Burrow (1978– ) (Aus) 1998 ASP World Tour Rookie of the Year, many ASP Tour wins

== C ==
- Ian Cairns (1952– ) (Aus) Champion surfer in the late 1970s
- Corky Carroll (1947– ) five time U.S. champion, 3 Time International Professional champion, International Big Wave champion, World Small Wave champion
- Heather Clark (RSA) 2001 Hawaiian Triple Crown champion
- Cas Collier (RSA) 1999 World Big Wave champion
- Richie Collins (1969– ) (USA)(surfer/shaper) Won 1988 O'Neil Coldwater Classic, 1989 Op Pro, 1992 Bells Beach Classic

== D ==
- Mike Diffenderfer (1937–2002) (USA) Surfer and shaper
- Miki Dora (1936–2002) (USA)
- Shane Dorian, (Haw) Pro surfer
- Mike Doyle (1941–2019) (USA) Surf/paddle champion, innovator. 1965 World Champion. Winner, 1968 Duke Kahanamoku Contest.

== E ==
- Laura Enever (1991– ) (Aus) 2009 ASP Women's World Junior Champion
- Michael Eppelstun (Aus) 1994 bodyboarding world champion

== F ==
- Mick Fanning (Aus) (1981– ) 3x World Champion
- Midget Farrelly (Aus) (1944–2016) Won the inaugural World Surfing Championship in 1964
- Sally Fitzgibbons (Aus) (1990– ) Multi ASP World Tour title-holder
- John John Florence (Haw) (1992– ) Won the 2011 Vans World Cup of Surfing, the youngest winner
- Jeremy Flores (1988– ) (Fra) 2007 WCT Rookie of the Year
- Mark Foo (1958–1994) (Haw) Professional surfer. Died while surfing at Mavericks.
- Donavon Frankenreiter (1972– ) (USA) Surfer and musician
- George Freeth (Haw) (1883–1919) Gave surfing exhibitions in Redondo Beach in 1907
- Skip Frye (1941– ) (USA) Legendary stylist and surfboard shaper
- Jim Fuller Godfather of surf guitar, Surfaris

== G ==
- Nick Gabaldon (1927–1951) California's first documented surfer of Black and Hispanic descent
- Maya Gabeira (1987– ) (Bra) Surfed the biggest wave ever by a female at 45 feet (14 m)
- Sunny Garcia (1970– ) (Haw) 2000 World Champion
- Yasnyiar Bonne Gea (1982– ) Indonesian surfing champion
- Stephanie Gilmore (1988– ) (Aus) 2007 ASP World Champion
- George Greenough (1941– ) (USA/Aus) 1960s kneeboard, shortboard, inventor and surf movies.

== H ==
- Jeff Hakman (1948– ) (Haw) Surfing champion of the 1970s
- Bethany Hamilton (February 8, 1990– ), (USA) Victim of a much-publicised shark attack.
- Laird Hamilton (March 2, 1964– ), (USA) (Hawaii and California), Big wave rider and tow-in surfing inventor.
- Damian Hardman (1966– ) (Aus) 1987 and 1991 World Champion
- Rhonda Harper (USA) Surfer and surf coach, founder of Black Girls Surf
- Paige Hareb (NZ)
- Peter Harris (1958– ) (Aus) Won the 1980 Stubbies as a rookie
- Chelsea Hedges (1983– ) (Aus) 2005 world title holder
- Fred Hemmings (Haw) 1968 World Champion
- Coco Ho (1991– ) (Haw) Women's ASP World Tour surfer, Michael Ho's daughter
- Derek Ho (Haw) 1993 World Champion, Michael Ho's younger son
- Mason Ho (1988– ) (Haw) professional surfer from Sunset Beach on the north shore. rides for mayhem.
- Michael Ho (1957– ) (Haw) Won Hawaiian Triple Crown, Duke Classic, World Cup and 1982 Pipe Masters
- CJ Hobgood (1979– ) (USA) 2001 World Champion
- Damien Hobgood (USA)
- Joyce Hoffman (USA) US Women's Champion 1965–67
- Phillip Hoffman (1930–2010) American big wave pioneer and surf apparel company executive
- John Holeman, professional surfer of the 1980s and 1990s
- Cheyne Horan (Aus) Active 1975–1993, world championship runner-up four times
- Jeff Hubbard (1975– ) (Haw) 3-time World Bodyboarding Champion
- Mike Hynson (USA) Star of The Endless Summer, surf board shaper who taught Robert August, and first Windansea Surf Club Vice President

== I ==
- Andy Irons (1978–2010) (Haw) Three-time world champion 2002–2004
- Bruce Irons (1979- ) (Haw)

== K ==
- Duke Paoa Kahanamoku (August 24, 1890 – January 22, 1968), (Haw) US Olympic Swimming Champion, Hawaiian Personality. The Father of Modern Surfing. Made appearances in Hollywood films (Mr. Roberts with Henry Fonda and Wake of the Red Witch with John Wayne).
- Dave Kalama (1964– ) (Haw) windsurfing and paddleboard champion
- Drew Kampion (1944– ) (USA) surf writer and editor, editor of Surfer Magazine (1968–71), author of Stoked: A History of Surf Culture, The Way of the Surfer, The Book of Waves, etc.
- Keala Kennelly (1978– ) (USA)
- Damian King (Aus) 2003 and 2004 World Bodyboarding Champion

== L ==
- Wes Laine (1960– ) A top 10 ASP World Championship Tour competitor - Wins: 1984 World Cup Sunset Beach, 1983 OP-Pro Atlantic City, 1985 Spur Ranch, Cape Town, South Africa, 2nd Place 1983 Rip-Curl Pro, Bells Beach
- Kai Lenny (1992- ) American professional surfer
- Isabel Letham (1899–1995) (Aus) first Australian to surf
- Antony Garrett Lisi (USA) physicist
- Jack London (1876–1916) (USA) writer, Hawaiian surfer
- Gerry Lopez (1948– ), (Haw) "Mr.Pipeline", Founder of Lightning Bolt surfboards and actor (played role of Subotai in Conan the Barbarian)
- Barton Lynch (1963– ) (Aus) 1988 World Champion, won 17 world tour events
- Wayne Lynch (1952– ) (Aus) influential Australian goofy-foot and winner of numerous 1960s and 1970s surf contests; subject of the 2013 biographical documentary Uncharted Waters

== M ==
- Rob Machado (1973– ) (USA) Won Pipeline Masters and U.S. Open of Surfing
- Cheyne Magnusson (c. 1984– ), US
- Ishita Malaviya, (India) first Indian female surfer
- Malia Manuel (1993– ) (Haw) 2008 US Open Champion (youngest ever)
- Brenden Margieson (1972– ) (Aus) First free-surfer, nominated two times Best Free-Surfer in the World by the magazine Australia's Surfing Life, won Nias Indonesia Pro 1999.
- Bobby Martinez (1986– ) (USA) 2006 Rookie of the Year
- Clay Marzo (1989– ) (USA) Three NSSA National surfing titles, a nomination for Maneuver of the Year at the 2007 Surfer Magazine Poll and Video Awards
- Gabriel Medina (1993– ) (BRA) 2013 WSL World Junior Champion, 2014 WSL World Champion (first Brazilian to win the title), 2015 Vans Triple Crown of Surfing Champion
- Pauline Menczer (1970– ) (Aus) 1988 amateur world champion, 1993 world champion
- Jessi Miley-Dyer (1986– ) (Aus)
- Wayne Miyata (1942–2005) (USA) California and Hawaii, "going tubular" in Endless Summer, famous color glosser
- Carissa Moore (1992– ) (Haw) 2011 ASP Women's World Champion, youngest female ever to win
- Jay Moriarity, professional surfer of Santa Cruz, 1978–2001
- Sofía Mulánovich (1983– ) (Peru) first South American to win the World Title in 2004
- Mickey Muñoz (1937– ) (USA) early surfing pioneer, also famous as a surfboard shaper

== N ==
- Greg Noll (1937– ) (USA) Big wave pioneer, rode biggest wave of his era at Makaha
- Kem Nunn (USA) Avid surfer and America's leading surf novelist
- David Nuuhiwa (1948– ) (USA) legendary nose rider from the 1960s

== O ==
- Margo Oberg (1953– ) (Haw) Three-time world champion 1977, 1980 & 1981
- Jamie O'Brien (1983– ) (Haw) Won ASP Pipeline Masters as a wildcard
- Mark Occhilupo (1966– ) (Aus) 1999 world champion
- Phyllis O'Donnell (1937–2024) (Aus) In 1964 won the inaugural women's World Championship Surfing Title at Manly Beach
- Jack O'Neill (1923–2017) Surfer and inventor of the modern wetsuit
- Marna Odendal (RSA) & (Trained in Aus) (2021-2025) Best surfer

== P ==
- Joel Parkinson (1981– ) (Aus)
- Mike Parsons (1965– ) Surfed largest recorded wave of 70 ft (21 m) at Cortes Bank
- Stacey Peralta (1957– ) (USA) Z-Boy
- Lakey Peterson (1994– ) (USA)
- Michael Peterson (1952–2012) (Aus) Australian champion 1972 and 1974
- Bob Pike (1940–1999) (Aus) Noted big wave surfer
- Felipe Pomar (1943– ) (Peru) 1965 World Champion
- Martin Potter (1965– ) (RSA) 1989 World Champion

== Q ==
- Maz Quinn (1976– ) (NZ) 4-time NZ national champion

== R ==
- Mark Richards (1957– ) (Aus) 4-time World Champion 1979–1982

== S ==
- Jacqueline Silva (1979– ) (Bra) Pioneer in Brazilian women's surfing
- Bob Simmons (1919–1954) (USA) Father of the modern surfboard
- Kelly Slater (1972– ) (USA) 11-time World Champion
- Jordy Smith (1988– ) (RSA)
- Mike Stewart (1963– ) (Haw) 9-time World Bodyboarding Champion
- Rell Sunn (1950–1998) (Haw) A top female surfer of the 1980s, known as the "Queen of Makaha"

== T ==
- Donald Takayama (1943–2012) (USA) Master's division of the United States Surfing Champions 1971, 1972 and 1973
- Guilherme Tamega (Bra) 6-time world champion bodyboarder
- Shaun Tomson (1955– ) (USA) Born in South Africa, currently living in the US, 1977 World Champion
- Peter Townend (1953– ) (Aus) 1976 World Champion
- Buzzy Trent (1929–2006) (USA) Pioneer of big wave surfing
- Joel Tudor (1976– ) (USA) Famous contemporary longboarder

== V ==
- Butch Van Artsdalen (1941–1979) (Haw) the original Mr. Pipeline
- Dale Velzy (1927–2005) (USA) 1950s surf shop pioneer and surfboard design innovator
- Peter Viertel (1920–2007) (USA) Introduced surfing in Europe
- Mark Visser (1983– ) (Aus) Big-wave surfer, the "Night Rider"

== W ==
- Terry Wade (1960- ) Noted as having ridden some of the largest waves at Newport Beach's The Wedge. Featured heavily in film "Dirty Old Wedge."
- Robert "Wingnut" Weaver Featured, along with Patrick O'Connell, in The Endless Summer II surf film.
- Sharon Webber (USA) Women's world surfing championship in 1970 and 1972
- Dewey Weber (1938–1993) (USA) Surfer and surfboard designer
- Dale Webster (1948– ) (USA) Northern California surfer who surfed over 10,407 days in a row, minimum of 3 waves a day. Appeared in the Step Into Liquid movie.
- John Whitmore (RSA) South African surfing pioneer.
- Dennis Wilson (1944–1983) (USA) Founding member of The Beach Boys
- Owen Wright (1990– ) (Aus) Won 2011 Quiksilver Pro
- Tyler Wright (1994– ) (Aus) 2016 WSL Women's World Champion

== Y ==
- Nat Young (1947– ) (Aus) World surfing champion 1966 and 1970, ASP World Longboard Tour Champion 1986 and 1988–1990. Tried to register surfing as an official religion.

== Z ==
- Frieda Zamba (1965– ) (USA) Four time world women's surfing champion 1984–1986 and 1988.
