= US Open of Surfing =

Annual surfing competition

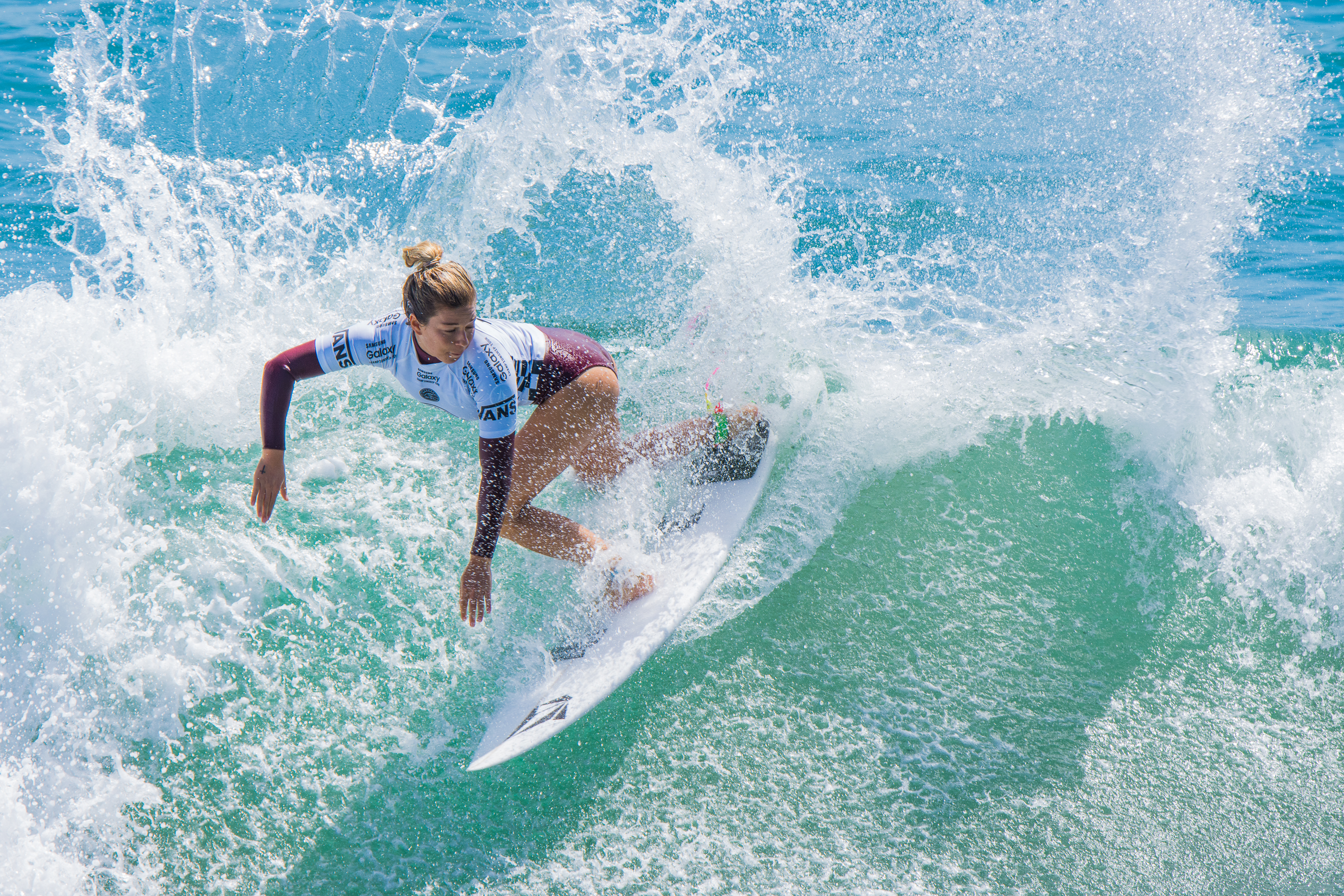
Coco Ho during the 2015 U.S. Open of Surfing

The U.S. Open of Surfing is a week-long surfing competition held annually during the summer in Huntington Beach, California. Generally held on the south side of the Huntington Beach Pier, the U.S. Open is part of the qualification process for the World Surf League and is a WSL QS 10,000 event. It is the largest surfing competition in the world. It was owned by IMG from 2000 until 2025, when ownership was passed to MARI.

As part of the event, notable people in the world of surfing are added to the Surfing Walk of Fame and to the Surfers' Hall of Fame, both directly across from the pier.

== History ==
The U.S. Open, then called the West Coast Surfing Championship, was first held in 1959. In 1964 it became known as the United States Surfing Championships. In 1982 it became known as the OP Pro for its sponsor, Ocean Pacific. The event was renamed the U.S. Open of Surfing in 1994.

The contest was traditionally held during Labor Day weekend. The event was changed to an earlier date following the 1986 event when riots occurred at the OP Pro.

Rioting again marred the 2013 U.S. Open. On the final day of the event, as the crowds left the contest area and filled Main Street, a civil disturbance erupted, resulting in property damage and several arrests and some injuries. As a result, the event owner IMG stated that in 2014 it will discontinue events such as free concerts and focus more on the sport.

Spending at the nine-day event adds $21.5 million to the Orange County economy and $16.4 million in Huntington Beach. It is attended by nearly 500,000 people.

== Champions ==
=== West Coast Surfing Champions ===
1959: Jack Haley, Linda Benson

1960: Mike Haley, Linda Benson

1961: Ron Sizemore, Linda Benson

1962: Ilima Kalama, Gudie Wilkie

1963: LJ Richards, Candy Calhoun

=== United States Surfing Champions ===
1964: Jim Craig, Linda Benson

1965: Mark Martinson, Joyce Hoffman

1966: Corky Carroll, Joyce Hoffman

1967: Corky Carroll, Joyce Hoffman

1968: David Nuuhiwa, Linda Benson

1969: Corky Carroll, Sharron Weber

1970: David Nuuhiwa, Joyce Hoffman

1971: Brad McCaul, Jericho Poppler

1972: Dale Dobson, Mary Setterholm

=== Op Pro Champions ===
1982: Cheyne Horan, Becky Benson

1983: Tom Curren, Kim Mearig

1984: Tom Curren, Frieda Zamba

1985: Mark Occhilupo, Jodie Cooper

1986: Mark Occhilupo, Frieda Zamba

1987: Barton Lynch, Wendy Botha

1988: Tom Curren, Jorja Smith

1989: Richie Collins, Frieda Zamba

1990: Todd Holland, Frieda Zamba

1991: Barton Lynch, Frieda Zamba

1992: Team USA (Kelly Slater, Richie Collins, Todd Holland, Mike Parsons, Alisa Schwarzstein)

1993: Sunny Garcia, Kim Mearig

=== U.S. Open Champions ===
1994: Shane Beschen, Lisa Andersen

1995: Rob Machado, Neridah Falconer

1996: Kelly Slater, Layne Beachley

1997: Beau Emerton, Rochelle Ballard

1998: Andy Irons, Layne Beachley

1999: Shea Lopez, Keala Kennelly

2000: Sunny Garcia, Tita Tavares

2001: Rob Machado, Pauline Menczer

2002: Kalani Robb, Pauline Menczer

2003: Cory Lopez, Chelsea Georgeson

2004: Taj Burrow, Chelsea Georgeson

2005: Andy Irons, Julia Christian

2006: Rob Machado, Sofia Mulanovich

2007: C.J. Hobgood, Stephanie Gilmore

2008: Nathaniel Curran, Malia Manuel

2009: Brett Simpson, Courtney Conlogue

2010: Brett Simpson, Carissa Moore

2011: Kelly Slater, Sally Fitzgibbons

2012: Julian Wilson, Lakey Peterson

2013: Alejo Muniz, Carissa Moore

2014: Filipe Toledo, Tyler Wright

2015: Hiroto Ohhara, Johanne Defay

2016: Filipe Toledo, Tatiana Weston-Webb

2017: Kanoa Igarashi, Sage Erickson

2018: Kanoa Igarashi, Courtney Conlogue

2019: Yago Dora, Sage Erickson

2020: Cancelled

2021: Griffin Colapinto, Caitlin Simmers

2022: Ezekiel Lau, Bettylou Sakura Johnson

2023: Eli Hanneman, Sawyer Lindblad

2024: Alan Cleland, Sally Fitzgibbons

2025: Levi Slawson, Sawyer Lindblad

=== U.S. Open of Longboarding Champions ===
Year	Pro Longboard Open
2025	Kai Ellice-Flint
2013-2016; Duct Tape Invitational	Justin Quintal (wins 4 in a row)
2012; Pacifico Noserider Invitational	Justin Quintal
2010-2011; Pacifico Noserider Invitational	Joel Tudor (wins 2 in a row)
2010; Trestles	Steven Mangiacapre
2009; Corona Noserider Invitational	Kevin Connolly
2008	Taylor Jensen ^{[2]}
2007	Colin McPhillips ^{[2]}
2006	Dodger Kremel
2005	Joel Tudor ^{[8]}
2004	Brendan White
2003	Taylor Jensen
2002	Joel Tudor ^{[7]}
2001	Josh Baxter
1995–2000	Joel Tudor (wins 6 in a row)
1994	Colin McPhillips

== Awards ==
Notable people are inducted into Surfing Walk of Fame and Surfers' Hall of Fame each year during the U.S. Open. The Walk of Fame has plaques imbedded in the sidewalk, while the Hall of Fame has handprints. Each are located across the street from one another and across Pacific Coast Highway from the Huntington Beach Pier.

=== Surfing Walk of Fame ===
Every year the Surfing Walk of Fame at Huntington Beach inducts members in the categories of surf pioneers, surfing champions, local heroes, surf culture, woman of the year, and honor roll. Eligibility for each award are as follows:

- The surf champion must have held the world championship and/or world class event titles specific to the city of Huntington Beach.
- Woman of the Year winners are chosen based on who garners the most collective votes from the surfing champions, surfing culture, surf pioneers, and local heroes categories.
- Local Hero award winners have either resided in Huntington Beach for ten years or graduated from the Huntington Beach Union High School District and were finalists in the surfing champions category, contributed to Huntington Beach surfing culture, were surf pioneers in the city, or were champions of the annual Huntington Beach City Championships.

Year	Surfing Champion	Woman of the Year	Local Hero	Surf Pioneer	Surf Culture	Honor Roll
2026	Jordy Smith	Patti Paniccia	Joey Hawkins	Mike Purpus	Phil Roberts	Dean Torrence of Jan and Dean
2025						
2024	Felipe Pomar	Sally Fitzgibbons	Jeff Deffenbaugh	Bing Copeland	Doug Warbrick, Brian Singer (founders of Rip Curl	Mike Hynson
2019	Derek Ho, Joel Tudor	Courtney Conlogue	Sam Hawk	Reynolds "Renny" Yater	Jeff Divine, Art Brewer	Don MacAllister
2018						
2017	Barton Lynch	Pam Burridge	Timmy Reyes	Jeff Hakman	Jim Jenks	Huntington Beach High School 50th Anniversary Coaches
2016	C. J. Hobgood	Mary Lou McGinnis Drummy	Timmy Turner	Whitey Harrison, Joey Cabell	Bob Hurley	Women's International Surfing Association (WISA)
2015	Reno Abellira	Sofía Mulánovich	John Boozer	Paul Strauch	Dick Graham	David Nuuhiwa, Sr.
2014	Larry Bertlemann	Phyllis O'Donnell	Mike Haley	Randy Rarick	John Van Hamersveld	Vince Moorhouse
2013	Taylor Knox	Keala Kennelly; Sharron Weber	Roy Crump, journalist	Donald Takayama	Jack McCoy, filmmaker	Father Christian Mondor
2012	Michael Ho	Alisa Schwarzstein-Cairns	George Draper	Michael Peterson and Dick Brewer	Sean Collins	Stacy Wood, Dwyer Middle School surf coach
2011	Rob Machado	Debbie Beacham; Kathy "Gidget" Kohner	Bill Fury	Skip Frye	Dick Dale	Hole in the Wall Gang surf team
2010	Sunny Garcia, Ian Cairns	Candy Calhoun	Rick "Rockin Fig" Fignetti	Dewey Weber	Dave Rochlen	Dick Baker
2009	Mark Martinson	Wendy Botha	Jackie Baxter	Fred Hemmings	Duke Boyd	50 Years at the HB Pier (Men's and Women's)
2008	Andy Irons	Lynne Boyer	Rich Chew	Buzzy Trent and Wayne Lynch	Drew Kampion	The NSSA Founders of 1978
2007	Midget Farrelly	Mimi Munro	Scott Farnsworth	George Greenough	Bill and Bob Meistrell	The H.B. Boys of 55'
2006	L.J Richards	Layne Beachley	Bob "The Greek" Bolen	Mickey Muñoz	Walter & Phillip Hoffman	Jan Gaffney
2005	David Nuuhiwa	Kim Hamrock	Carl Hayward	Buffalo Keaulana	George Greenough	Paul Morrow
2004	Corky Carroll	Lisa Andersen	Rich Harbour	Pat Curren	Gordon Clark	Meg Bernardo
2003	Martin Potter	Marge Calhoun	Chuck Linnen	Mike Doyle	Larry "Flame" Moore and Tom Morey	Michelle Turner
2002	Kelly Slater	Kim Mearig	Brad Gerlach	Miki Dora	Steve Pezman	Andy Verdone
2001	Wayne "Rabbit" Bartholomew	Janice Aragon	David Nuuhiwa	Rabbit Kekai	Simon Anderson	Max Bowman
2000	Mark Occhilupo	Nancy Katin	Bud Llamas	Eddie Aikau and Gerry Lopez	MacGillivray Freeman	Mike Abdelmuti and George Farquhar
1999	Tom Carroll	Jericho Poppler	Jack Haley	George Downing	Leroy Grannis	Chuck Allen
1998	Peter "PT" Townend	Frieda Zamba	Chuck Dent	Dr. John Heath "Doc" Ball	Jack O'Neill	Ann Beasley and Natalie Kotsch
1997	Shaun Tomson	Linda Benson	Gordie Duane	Dale Velzy	Hobie Alter and Rick Griffin	Bud and Gordie Higgins
1996	Nat Young	Rell Sunn	Corky Carroll	Greg Noll	Bud Browne	Tom Pratte and John Rothrock
1995	Tom Curren	Margo Oberg	Herbie Fletcher	Phil Edwards	John Severson	Jack Hokanson
1994	Mark Richard	Joyce Hoffman	Robert August	Tom Blake and Honorary induction for Duke Kahanamoku, the "Father of Surfing"	Bruce Brown	None

=== Surfers' Hall of Fame ===
Inductees by year are as follows:

- 2026: Courtney Conlogue, Jay Larson
- 2025: Dwight Dunn, Caroline Marks, Tom Servais, Kolby Aipa (awarded posthumously on September 18, 2025)
- 2024: Jeff Deffenbaugh, Jamie O’Brien, Ilima Kalama, Sugar the Surfing Dog (inducted in December 2024)
- 2022: Peter Mel, Martin Daly, Michele Turner
- 2019: Janice Aragon, Kai Lenny, Sam Hawk
- 2018: Ben Aipa, Herbie Fletcher, Brett Simpson
- 2017: Mick Fanning, Bethany Hamilton
- 2016: Blaine "Sumo" Sato, Shawn Stussy, Ryan Turner
- 2015: Gordon "Grubby" Clark, C.J. Hobgood, John Davis
- 2014: Timmy Turner, Carissa Moore, Rusty Preisendorfer
- 2013: Skip Frye, Rick "Rockin' Fig" Fignetti, Shane Dorian
- 2012: Rabbit Kekai, Dane Reynolds, Andy Verdone
- 2011: George Downing, Chuck Linnen, Simon Anderson, Taylor Knox
- 2010: Stephanie Gilmore, Ian Cairns, Randy Lewis
- 2009: Dick Baker, Chris Hawk, Joey Buran, Pat O'Connell, Bruce Brown, Jeff Hakman
- 2008: Wayne “Rabbit” Bartholomew, Sean Collins, Brad Gerlach, Mike Parsons
- 2007: Martin Potter, Bruce Irons, Al Merrick, Sofia Mulanovich
- 2006: Layne Beachley, Bob Hurley, Rob Machado, Greg Noll
- 2005: Carl Hayward, Tom Carroll, Bob McKnight, Mark Richards
- 2004: David Nuuhiwa, Jack Haley, Jericho Poppler, Mark Occhilupo, Peter "PT" Townend, Gerry Lopez
- 2003: Andy Irons, Shaun Tomson, Tom Curren, Jack O’Neill, Bud Llamas, Paul Strauch, Mike Doyle
- 2002: Laird Hamilton, Lisa Andersen, Kelly Slater, Joel Tudor, Robert “Wingnut” Weaver, Robert August, Corky Carroll
