= Nose ride =

Riding the front end of a surfboard

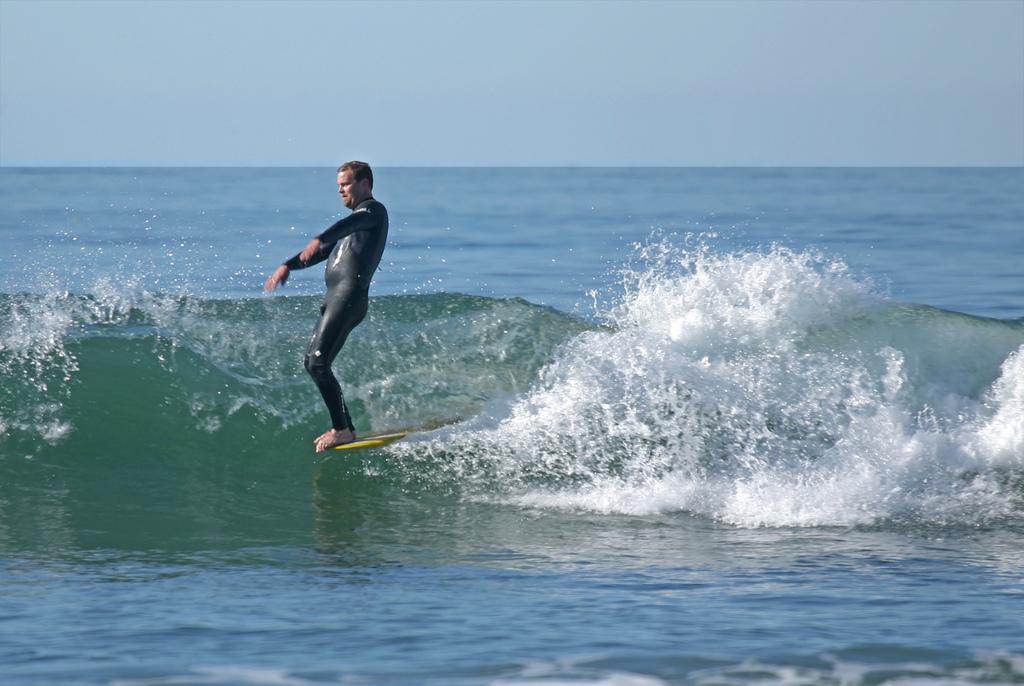
Surfer noseriding at Tourmaline Surfing Park in 2008

Noseriding is the act of riding the front end of a surfboard. It is one of the most accomplished maneuvers in surfing. Some advanced maneuvers include: hang ten toes, hang five toes, stretch-five, front foot/heel hang, and back foot/heel hang. Noseriding is a functional maneuvers best performed on waves around head high or less in size. Noseriding is performed mainly on noserider-style surfboards, which are generally 275 cm (9 ft) or more in length, with larger surface area and higher water displacement to provide a more stable walking surface.

== Background ==
American surfer and writer Matt Warshaw wrote, "Noseriding was not identified as a maneuvers unto itself until the early 1950s, after the surfboard fin had grown big enough to really anchor the tail." According to most surfing historians, the fin was invented by Tom Blake around 1935, for the purpose of anchoring the tail and giving the surfboard direction from the tail to the tip. The fin enabled skilled surfers to walk to the front of the board without the tail skipping out from the wave. In 1947, Joe Quigg recorded, in drawings and words, the noseriding skill of Rabbit Kekai on waves at "Outer Queens" near Waikiki, Hawaii. One of the first commercial surfboard manufacturers, Dale Vezy, is credited as being the first to get to the nose to hang five and hang ten in the early 1950s. Noseriding is widely considered the origin of "extreme" surfing and had become such a popular trick by the late 1950s that Surfer Magazine publisher John Severson devoted a regular feature to it called "Toes on the Nose", starting with his debut issue of Surfer in 1960.

Noseriding defined the surfers of the 1950s led by Rabbit Kekai, Matt Kivlin and Joe Quigg. Then came the champion surfers of the 1960s including Lance Carson, Phil Edwards, Dewey Weber, Mickey Muñoz, Joey Cabell, Donald Takayama, Skip Frye, David Nuuhiwa, Gary Proper, Claude Codgen and Bob Purvey. The modern generation of noseriding surfer champions include Joel Tudor, CJ Nelson and Chad Marshall. Current toe-pointing women Association of Surfing Professional's World Tour champions include Kelia Moniz from Hawaii, Belinda Baggs from Australia, Chloe Calmon from Brazil and Kassia Meador from the USA.

Throughout the 1950s and 1960s, surfboard designers experimented with a variety of components to make the nose hold up longer, and noserider surfboard designs became popularly-sold items during the 1960s. The combinations of template (outline shape), thickness, weight, rocker, rail shape, concaves, convexes, flats and fins vary with the individual surfer's style and size, and continue to be an experiment. To this day, noserider designs continue to be refined.

So far the knowledge bank has established certain principles: Concave under the nose creates an air pocket that helps the nose stay up longer; complementing the concave nose is a kicked-up tail that would catch water to keep the tail down. While an accomplished surfer can nose ride a narrow shortboard nose, a wide nose (about 45 to 50 cm (18 to 20 in) wide) is considered a better platform for stability and lift. Rail shape can significantly affect the maneuverability from the nose. Rail shapes vary from turned up rails, which are found in most of today's noseriders, to turned down rails. Turned-up rails allow the board to turn easier from the tip, while the turned-down rail forces the board to stay in a trim and limits the turning ability from the tip. Of course, placement of the turned up or turned down rail is important. Turned up rails work best around the nose, while turned down rails work best around the tail. How much turn-down or turn up is measured in percentages, i.e., 70/30 means 70% down and 30% up. Lighter board weights enable the board to stay higher on the water, so it can travel faster and allow the board to respond quicker, and a lighter board allows for a thinner board. Single fins are preferred, albeit, fin configurations have a wide open frontier, as are weights and thickness.

Noseriding is achieved mostly when the surfer positions themselves and the board where the wave is formed into the most vertical wall, just before the wave breaks. Point Break waves are ideal for noseriding because the wave travels from the point to the cove and gives the surfer a long ride where a "hook" is formed with the most vertical wall that travels down the line, like a zipper, from one end to the other. Immediately after the hook is the white water, where the wave implodes. It is best to avoid the white water but with a noserider surfboard, an accomplished surfer can ride through or manoeuvre around the imploding wave while remaining on the nose. One of the most difficult noseriding manoeuvres is to get tubed while on the tip. It is not impossible to stay on the nose while out on the flat shoulder of the wave either. A noserider surfboard with a deep concave can carry a surfer on a wave that does not have a steep wall. The surfer must be prepared to back off the nose in this flat area of the wave because it has the least air traveling under the nose, so riding onto the flat of the wave while on the nose could cause the nose to suddenly dip into the water under the full weight of the surfer.

In 1965, Tom Morey (inventor of the "Morey-Boogie" body board) devised the first professional surf contest around timing nose rides. The "nose" area was defined as the front 25% of the board. While success at this subgenre is grossly measured in proximity to the tip of the board and time spent there, the acknowledged stylists move forward and backward fluidly on the board by cross-stepping or "walking" foot-over-foot and/or shuffling with poise and economy of movement, resolving changes in upward pressure with subtle adjustments to their center of gravity using knees, waist and hips (upper bodies ever quiet) and position on the board; never the arms waving.

== See also ==
- Glossary of surfing
