= Surftech =

- Founded: 1992; 33 years ago in Santa Cruz, California
- Founder: Randy French
- Parent: Triple D
- Website: surftech.com

Surftech is a surfboard and standup paddleboard manufacturing company. It specializes in mass-produced expanded polystyrene boards pressed in molds designed by established surfboard shapers.

== History ==
Surftech was founded in Santa Cruz, California in 1992 by surfboard shaper Randy French, who wanted to see the industry expand from its focus on individually-shaped boards to efficiently manufactured mass production. French had previously owned a sailboard manufacturing company called Seatrend, where he developed the production techniques he later employed at Surftech. The success of his initial product attracted the interest of other professional shapers such as Dale Velzy, Reynolds Yater, Donald Takayama, Mickey Munoz and Robert August.

Surftech came to the fore at a time of increased focus on new technologies within the surfboard production industry. Whereas traditional boards are made using polyurethane foam "blanks" that are then cut and sanded to form by shapers, Surftech uses a process of blowing polystyrene into preset molds designed by its various shapers. The blanks are then coated with polyvinyl chloride, laminated, and finished. This results in a board that is stronger and considerably lighter than traditional polyurethane boards.

Surftech boards are now manufactured in Thailand and shipped throughout the world. As of 2015, Surftech is owned by Triple D, a Thailand-based investment company.
