= Chris Christenson (surfboard shaper) =

American surfboard designer and craftsman

- Born: May 14, 1973 (age 53); Whittier, California
- Education: Point Loma Nazarene University
- Occupation: Surfboard shaper
- Years active: 25+
- Known for: Surfboard Shaping, Surfing, Snowboarding, designing surfboards and other products in the Action Sports industry
- Notable work: Greg Long's two-time big wave world champion
- Website: http://christensonsurfboards.com/

Chris Christenson (born May 14, 1973, Whittier, CA) is an American surfboard shaper, craftsman, and outdoor enthusiast.

== Background ==
Born and raised in Southern California, Christenson's passionately pursued a variety of activities including surfing at Seal Beach and Newport Beach, hiking in the San Bernardino mountains where his grandparents had a cottage, or golfing. Growing up, Christenson would often watch his next door neighbor shape surfboards in his garage, but it wasn't until he was 18 and on a golf/academic scholarship at Point Loma Nazarene University that he bought his first surfboard blank, borrowed his neighbor's tools, and shaped his first board.

== Shaping career ==
In 1992, Christensen's shaping career began with a six-year apprenticeship under Dick Brewer (1936-2022), as well as the influence of his then neighbor, Skip Frye. Christensen's boards were ridden by legendary big wave surfer Greg Long through two big wave world titles, wins at the 2008 Mavericks surf contest and 2009 Quiksilver In Memory of Eddie Aikau big-wave contest, and multiple XXL awards. Ian Walsh took home the 2018 Ride of the Year and Tube of the Year at the WSL Big Wave Awards for a massive wave he rode on a Christensen board to win the Pe’ahi Challenge in 2017. Christensen shapes daggers, retro fishes and longboards, among others, for an elite customer base that includes top surfers worldwide to pro baseball and football stars, rock musicians and surfers on all sorts of waves, and with handcrafted designs. Cristensen has once said, "A lot of my traditional designs, I designed as if the late sixties never stopped...that period was rad." Christensen Surfboards currently offers 30 different models, along with custom designs created by Chris.

In 2012, Chris acquired Moonlight Glassing, which is now located next to Christenson Surfboards in San Marcos, CA. Moonlight Glassing is a shop in the southern California surfboard crafting world. Christenson boards are glassed at Moonlight along with dozens of other shapers' surfboards.

== Snow-Surf Crossover ==
Christensen's passion for the outdoors is as deep-rooted as it can be in Southern California. When he wasn't in school or surfing, Chris often spent free time at his grandparents' cabin in the San Bernardino mountains. Feeling the congruity between snowboarding and surfing, Christensen's passion didn't end on the mountain. Through the surf industry and snowboarding, Christensen became close friends with big mountain rider, Jeremy Jones. Based on their love of backcountry snowboarding and surfing, Christensen and Jones began a collaboration to create a snowboard that captured the congruence of snowboarding and surfing. Born of Christensen and Jones's surf/design partnership was the well-received 'storm chaser' - a swallowtail with a surfboard rocker and the ability for tight turns on groomers or in the deepest powder. From the first collaboration board in 2012, the Jones / Christenson partnership has grown to include eight models including the binding-less Mountain Surfer, Mind Expander, Ultra Mind Expander, Mind Expander Twin, Storm Chaser, and Lone Wolf. There are also split board models available for both the Storm Chaser and Mind Expander.

== Partnerships and Product Collaborations ==
Chris partners with a wide range of sport and lifestyle brands including Electric Visual, Captain Fin Company, FCS, Axxe Wetsuits, 32, Etnies, Yow and Jones Snowboards. Brands work with Chris both as a rider, but also as a craftsman with an eye for style and design to create unique products for surf and snow including his signature 32 snowboarding boot and signature model surfboard fin designs with Captain Fin and FCS.

== Filmography ==
For the 2010 film Grey Whale Sessions, Chris joins musician Garret "G. Love" Dutton, surfer Keith Malloy, and artist Tyler Warren on a trip to Mexico, where Christensen surfs his 12,000 board shaped. In 2016's Distance Between Dreams from Red Bull Media House, Christensen appears in the film working with Ian Walsh on designing and then crafting boards to take on the biggest wave on Maui, Jaws. Christensen co-stars in Teton Gravity Research's 2018 film Life Of Glide, designing snowboards with Jones, surfing, snowboarding and meeting with legendary southern California surfboard shaper and one of Chris' mentors Skip Frye.

== Outside the Shaping Bay ==
In 2010 and 2013, Chris successfully competed in the Molokai 2 Oahu paddle world championship – a formidable 32-mile Kaiwi Channel that separates the islands of Molokai and Oahu. Chris races on the American Historic Racing Motorcycle Association, Hell on Wheels and California Vintage Motocross circuits. Having golfed in High School on the Junior PGA, including a few second place finishes to Tiger Woods, Chris went on to play in college and maintains a 4.7 handicap today.

== Current Life ==
Chris currently splits his time between North County San Diego, Cocoa Beach, Florida and Swall Meadows, California, near Bishop, California. You may find him racing vintage motorcycles, golfing at his home golf course, surfing the local breaks of North San Diego County, or heading north on 395 to his cabin in the eastern Sierra mountains.
