= Nick Gabaldón =

- Born: Nicolás Rolando Gabaldón; February 23, 1927; Los Angeles, California, United States
- Died: June 6, 1951 (aged 24); Santa Monica, California, United States
- Known for: Surfing

Nicolás Rolando Gabaldón (February 23, 1927 – June 6, 1951) was an early surfer who is credited by surfing experts with being California's first documented surfer of African-American and Latino descent at a time when many beaches were segregated and opportunities for minorities more limited than today. Despite being an amateur recreational surfer rather than a professional competitive surfer, he is widely considered a role model for his part in the history of surfing and African American history in the areas of Santa Monica and California.

Gabaldón was born February 23, 1927, in Los Angeles, California. His mother was Black and his father was Latino. Very little is known of his childhood. He lived most of his life in Santa Monica, California and was one of 50 black students at Santa Monica High School during the 1940s. Gabaldón taught himself how to surf at a 200-foot roped off stretch of demarcated beach which was part of Santa Monica State Beach. This area of beachfront was informally referred to by names such as "Ink Well Beach", "Negro Beach", and other more derogatory names. In 1924, after the forced closure of black owned and operated Bruce's Beach and due to de facto segregation, that portion of beachfront near Bay Street and Ocean Boulevard became the only place in Southern California that racial minorities were freely allowed to use without harassment or violence. The area remains popular with African American Angelenos up through present day.

== Accomplishments ==
After serving in the Navy Reserve during World War II, Gabaldón enrolled in Santa Monica College, where he divided his time between pursuing his studies, surfing and working as a lifeguard. Around 1949, Gabaldón began surfing in Malibu, California at Surfrider Beach where he was accepted without question by several mainland surf pioneers. His friends and surf contemporaries included Greg Noll, Mickey Munoz, Ricky Grigg, Matt Kivlin, Buzzy Trent, Robert Wilson Simmons aka "Bob Simmons". and Les Williams. Since he did not own a vehicle, Gabaldón would either get there by hitchhiking on the Pacific Coast Highway, or he would use his surfboard to paddle the 12 miles to Malibu by way of Santa Monica Bay. According to the Encyclopedia of Surfing, Gabaldón did this water commute each day for several weeks.

Gabaldón died when he crashed into the Malibu Pier while attempting a surfing move known as a "pier ride" or "shooting the pier". At that time, there was a south swell that came on, creating some of the biggest waves known in that area. Gabaldón's surfboard was found immediately, but it would be 3 to 4 days before his body was found washed up on Las Flores Beach, further east of the Pier. The coroner ruled that Gabaldón died as a result of drowning. Most of his Malibu-based surfing peers had attended Gabaldón's rosary. His funeral was held at St. Monica Catholic Church, Santa Monica. He is buried in Woodlawn Memorial Cemetery.

Six days prior to his death, Gabaldón had submitted a poem for submission to the Santa Monica College literary magazine. It was entitled "Lost Lives" where he describes the sea as "capricious", "vindictive" and where men "do battle but still die." Some see the poem as being somewhat prophetic in light of how he died. The poem was published in its entirety in the now-defunct Santa Monica Evening Outlook.

== Legacy ==
On September 7, 2007, officials for the City of Santa Monica announced plans to commemorate the stretch of Santa Monica State Beach called the Ink Well, and to post a plaque to honor Gabaldón's contribution to the sport of surf. The plaque was officially dedicated on February 7, 2008.

The Black Surfers Collective stages an annual Nick Galbaldón Day, which includes surf lessons for the community.
