= Philip Hoffman (surfing) =

American surfer and businessman (1930–2010)

Philip Rube "Flippy" Hoffman
- Born: January 24, 1930; Glendale, California
- Died: November 10, 2010 (aged 80); Mission Viejo, California
- Education: Hollywood High School
- Occupations: Big wave surfer, businessman

Philip Rube "Flippy" Hoffman (January 24, 1930 – November 10, 2010) was an American big wave surfing pioneer and businessman.

== Early life ==
Hoffman was born in Glendale, California, in 1930 He graduated from Hollywood High School in 1948. Hoffman began surfing off San Onofre, California. In 1953, he was one of the first surfers to brave the outer reefs of the Oahu's North Shore where he was a big wave surfing pioneer. Hoffman also worked as an abalone fisherman while he was not surfing.

== Hoffman California Fabrics ==
In the late 1950s, Hoffman helped run his family's textile business, Hoffman California Fabrics, along with his brother Walter. The company was started in 1924 by their father Rube Hoffman, originally selling woolen flannel fabrics. Hoffman oversaw the company's business that sold directly to retail stores. He was also involved in researching the production processes and creating new designs Hoffman Fabrics was integral in creating and manufacturing surf apparel from the late 1950s onward. In the 1980s, the aloha shirt worn by Tom Selleck in the TV series Magnum, P.I. was made from Hoffman fabric. It is now in the Smithsonian Institution.

"When the surf was really big, he'd take off and go surfing", said his brother. Hoffman worked with surfboard designers such as Mickey Munoz, Hobie Alter and Bob Simmons to improve the design of surf boards.

== Personal life ==
Hoffman died at Mission Viejo, California, from pulmonary fibrosis complications. He was survived by his partner Suzy, brother Walter, daughter Dana, and son Marty. His brother's daughter Joyce Hoffman was a champion surfer, and great-grandson Greyson Fletcher a professional skateboarder.

== Honors ==
Philip Hoffman and his brother Walter were honored in the Huntington Beach Surfing Walk of Fame in 2006 for their contributions to surf culture.

On July 21, 2025, the city of Dana Point unveiled a statue of Philip "Flippy" Hoffman and Walter Hoffman by Bill Limebrook. The statues depict the brothers standing with a ten-foot surfboard between them, and they were the eighth and ninth life-size cast bronze statues by William Limebrook at Watermen's Plaza of Dana Point and watersport athletes, surfers, filmmakers, artists, and entrepreneurs. Joyce Hoffman, Philip Hoffman's niece and daughter of Walter Hoffman, was honored in 2022 with a statue of herself on a surfboard by William Limebrook, at the same Watermen's Plaza location.
