= Surf film =

Film genre

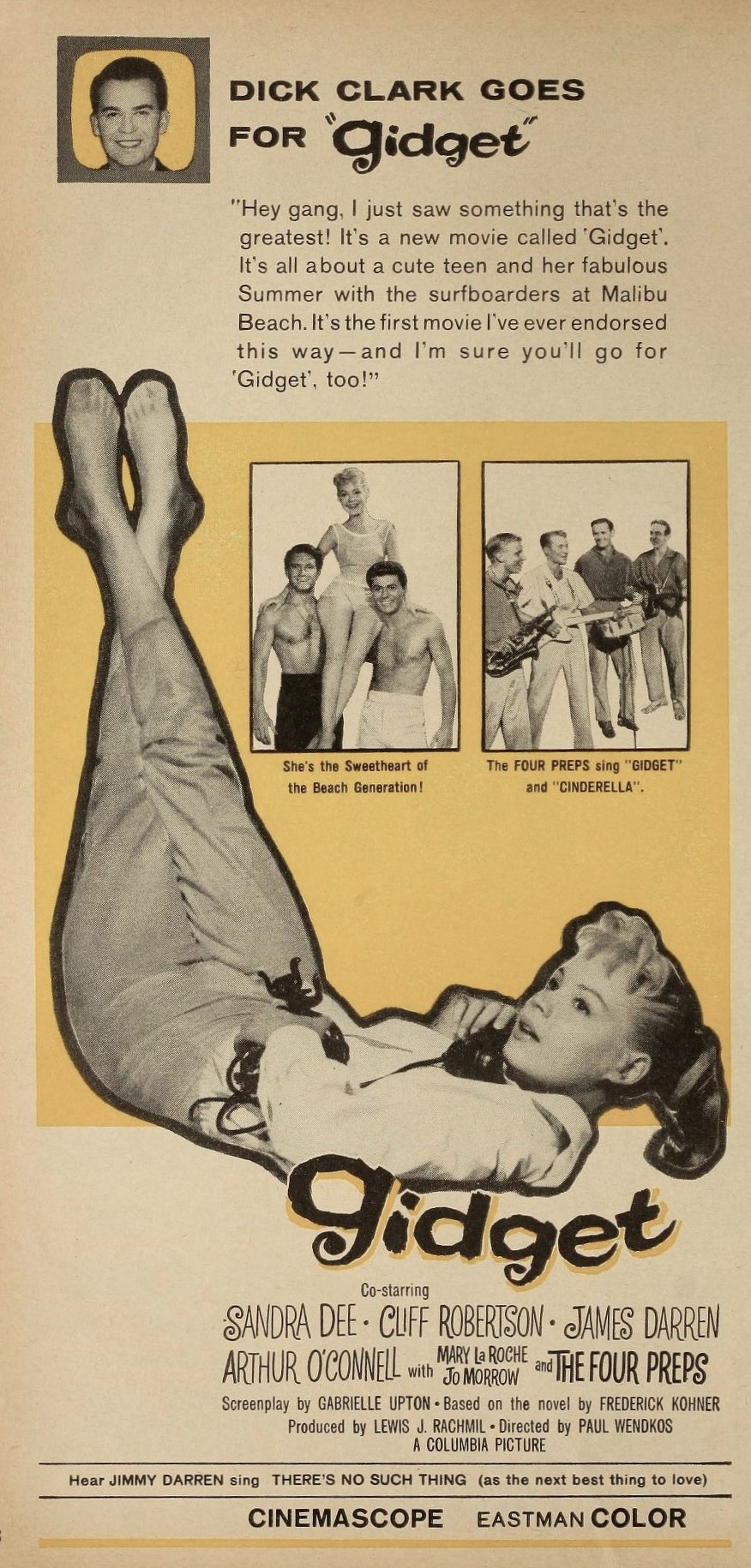
Gidget (1959)

Surf movies fall into three distinct genres:

- The surfing documentary — targeting the surfing enthusiast.
- The 1960s beach party films — targeting the broader community.
- Fictional feature films with a focus on the reality of surfing.

== Surfing documentaries ==
Hawaiian Islands (1906)

The earliest-known footage of people surfing was captured by Robert Kates Bonine in 1906 in Hawaii. Bonine (1861-1923) was shooting an actuality film for Thomas Edison from May 31 through at least August 12, 1906. Edison's film, Hawaiian Islands, was distributed in 1907 and features more than 30 segments, of which three (Panoramic View - Waikiki Beach Honolulu, Surf Board Riders - Waikiki Honolulu and Surf Scenes - Waikiki Honolulu) depict people surfing.

The surfing documentary film was pioneered by Bud Browne in the early 1950s and later popularized by director Bruce Brown (of The Endless Summer fame) in the late 1950s and early 1960s. Surfing films were later advanced by Greg MacGillivray and Jim Freeman (in such films as Five Summer Stories) in the 1970s and beyond; MacGillivray and Freeman later went on to film IMAX movies such as To Fly! and Speed. The genre itself has been defined by surfers traveling with their friends and documenting the experience on film. Starting in the 1960s, the films of Bruce Brown, Greg Noll, Bud Browne, John Severson and others were projected for audiences in music halls, civic centers, coffee houses, and high school gyms and auditoriums.

During the 1980s, the market for surf films surged with the release of more affordable video cameras. By the following decade, the surfing market became saturated with low- and medium-budget surf films, many with soundtracks that reflected surf music. With the advent of surf films on VHS and DVD led to a decrease in public showings. Furthermore, large surf brands began sponsoring surf films to promote clothing and product sales. Titles like Sonny Miller's The Search for Rip Curl redefined the genre with exotic locales, big budgets, and big name surfers such as Tom Curren.

Since the late 1990s, there has been a revival of the independent surf film. Artists such as The Malloys, Jack Johnson, and Jason Baffa have reinvented the genre by shooting self-financed 16mm films with music by artists including G. Love, Alexi Murdoch, Mojave 3, White Buffalo, and Donavon Frankenreiter, creating what the surf media has called "modern classics." Some venues still show surfing films on the big screen.

Examples of surfing documentaries include:

- Hawaiian Islands (1906)
- Surfing, National Sport in the Hawaiian Islands (1911)
- Burton Holmes’ Hawaiian Shores (1921)
- Topical Budget 884-2 Bucking the Waves (1928)
- The Leader News (1939 Vol. 4, No. 1): Water Babes Slam Slippers
- Pictorial Sportreel: Riding the Crest (1939)
- Surfboard Rhythm (1947)
- Thrills of the Surf (1949)
- Surfing Daze (1949)
- Slippery When Wet (1958)
- Surf Crazy (1959)
- Honolulu Surfing Daze (1959)
- Barefoot Adventure (1960)
- Surfing Hollow Days (1961)
- Waterlogged (1962)
- Gone With the Wave (1964)
- King of the Wild Waves (1964)
- The Living Curl (1965)
- The Endless Summer (1966)
- The Moods of Surfing (1967)
- The Fantastic Plastic Machine (1969)
- The Innermost Limits of Pure Fun (1970)
- Five Summer Stories (1972)
- Morning of the Earth (1972)
- Crystal Voyager (1973)
- Tubular Swells (1975)
- Storm Riders (1982)
- Momentum (1992)
- Endless Summer II (1994)
- The Kill (1993)
- Thicker than Water (2000)
- September Sessions (2000)
- The Endless Summer: Revisited (2000)
- Liquid Time (2002)
- Surf Movie: reels 1-14 (2003)
- Blue Horizon (2003)
- Step Into Liquid (2003)
- Glass Love (2004)
- Riding Giants (2004)
- Somewhere, Anywhere, Everywhere (2004)
- Singlefin: yellow (2004)
- The Seedling (2004)
- AKA Girl Surfer (2004)
- Billabong Odyssey (2005)
- Fair Bits (2005)
- Going With The Flow: Classic California Soul Surfing (2005)
- Sprout (2005)
- A Broke Down Melody (2006)
- Free As A Dog (2006)
- Peel: The Peru Project - A Surf Odyssey (2006)
- The Secret Machine (2006)
- One California Day (2007)
- Sipping Jetstreams (2007)
- The Forgotten Coast (2007)
- Bustin' Down the Door (2008)
- New Emissions of Light and Sound (2008)
- Live: A Music & Surfing Experience (2008)
- Water man (2008)
- Waveriders (2008)
- Out of Place (2009)
- The Present (2009)
- Fiberglass and Megapixels (2010)
- First Love (2010)
- God Went Surfing With The Devil (2010)
- White Wash
- Year Zero (2011)
- Drift (2012)
- Here & Now: A Day in the Life of Surfing (2012)
- Spirit of Akasha (2014)
- Strange Rumblings in Shangri-LA (2014)
- View from a Blue Moon (2015)
- Bethany Hamilton: Unstoppable (2018)
- Self Discovery for Social Survival (2019)
- In The Water, Behind The Lens (2022)

== Beach Party films ==
An alternative type of surf movie is the "beach party film" or "surf-ploitation flick" by true surfers. These films had little to do with the authentic sport and culture of surfing, and instead represented movies that attempted to cash in on the growing popularity of surfing among youth in the early 1960s. Examples of Beach Party films include:

- Gidget (1959)
- Gidget Goes Hawaiian (1961)
- Beach Party (1963)
- Ride the Wild Surf (1964)
- Surf Party (1964)
- Beach Blanket Bingo (1965)
- Malibu Beach (1978)
- The Beach Girls (1982)
- Spring Break (1983)
- Hardbodies (1984)
- Back to the Beach (1987)
- Teen Beach Movie (2013)

== Narrative Surf Films ==
In narrative surf films, surfing is occasionally portrayed more realistically within fictional storylines, or used as a backdrop or side theme.

- Big Wednesday (1978)
- Puberty Blues (1981)
- Surf II (1984)
- North Shore (1987)
- Surf Nazis Must Die (1987)
- Point Break (1991)
- A Scene at the Sea (1991)
- Surf Ninjas (1993)
- Blue Juice (1995)
- In God's Hands (1998)
- Blue Crush (2002)
- Local Boys (2002)
- Lords of Dogtown (2005)
- Surf's Up (2007)
- Soul Surfer (2011)
- Blue Crush 2 (2011)
- Chasing Mavericks (2012)
- Drift (2013)
- The Perfect Wave (2014)
- Point Break (2015)
- The Pro (Die Pro) (2015)
- Surf's Up 2: WaveMania (2017)

== See also ==
- Ski film

== Sources ==
- Booth, Douglas (1996) "Surfing Films and Videos: Adolescent Fun, Alternative Lifestyle, Adventure Industry" Journal of Sport History
- Thoms, Albie (2000) Surfmovies: The History of the Surf Film in Australia ISBN 0958742030
- Lisanti, Tom (2005) Hollywood Surf And Beach Movies: The First Wave, 1959-1969 ISBN 0786421045
- Warshaw, Matt (2005) Surf Movie Tonite!: Surf Movie Poster Art, 1957-2004 San Francisco: Chronicle Books ISBN 9780811848732
- Williams, Randy (2006) Sports Cinema 100 Movies: The Best of Hollywood's Athletic Heroes, Losers, Myths, and Misfits Limelight Editions ISBN 9780879103316 pg 134-136
- Chidester, Brian; Priore, Domenic; Zuckerman, Kathy (2008) Pop Surf Culture: Music, Design, Film, and Fashion from the Bohemian surf boom Santa Monica Press ISBN 9781595800350 Chapter 7
- Ormrod & Wheaton (2009) On the edge: leisure, consumption and the representation of adventure sports Leisure Studies Association Issue 104: 17-25
- Engle, John (2015) Surfing in the Movies: A Critical History McFarland ISBN 9780786495214
- JONES, DAVIS (2017) “History Of Surfing: Bud Browne Goes To The Movies” Surfer
- MacGillivray, Greg (2019) “The evolution of the surf film” Surfer Today
