= AOW - Gis vs Pros =

Art of War MMA event in 2007

Art of War Undisputed Arena Fighting Championship: AOW - GIs vs Pros
- Date: October 27, 2007
- Venue: Grand Casino Tunica
- City: Tunica, Mississippi

Event chronology
Art of War 4	Art of War Undisputed Arena Fighting Championship: AOW - GIs vs Pros	AOW - Mano A Mano

Art of War Undisputed Arena Fighting Championship: Art of War GIs vs Pros was the fifth mixed martial arts event by the mixed martial arts organization Art of War Undisputed Arena Fighting Championship. The event took place on Saturday, April 19, 2008 at the Grand Casino Tunica in Tunica, Mississippi. The card was aired on Fox Sports Net (FSN).

== History ==
The fight card included James Damien Stelly and Ron Faircloth in the main event. The show also featured a bout between Mike Wessel and Patrick Castillo. This card featured military (active or former) veterans pitted against MMA professionals.

== Results ==
Main card
Weight class				Method	Round	Time	Notes
Heavyweight	James Damien Stelly	def.	Ron Faircloth	Submission (Rear-Naked Choke)	1	0:44
Heavyweight	Mike Wessel	def.	Patrick Castillo	Decision (Split)	3	5:00
Welterweight	Andrew Chappelle	def.	Mike Bogner	Submission (Rear-Naked Choke)	1	1:06
Heavyweight	Darrill Schoonover	def.	Chris Hawk	Submission (Rear-Naked Choke)	1	4:40
Middleweight	David Brown	def.	John Meyer	TKO (Injury)	1	4:40
Preliminary card
Welterweight	Keith Bach	def.	Justin Hamm	TKO (Punches)	3	1:18
Lightweight	Brian Foster	def.	Nuri Shaklr	Submission (Guilotine Choke)	1	1:09
Light Heavyweight	Tom Jones	def.	Chris Gates	Submission (Heel Hook)	1	0:46
Light Heavyweight	Bill Collins	def.	Ryan McClain	Submission (Rear-Naked Choke)	1	1:03
