= Gordon Clark (disambiguation) =

Gordon Clark (1902–1985) was an American philosopher and theologian.

Gordon Clark may also refer to:

- Gordon Clark (footballer) (1914–1997), English fullback
- Gordon "Grubby" Clark, surfboard blank manufacturer
- Gordon "Nobby" Clark (born 1950), Scottish pop singer and Bay City Rollers member
- Gordon Clark (activist), American activist and politician
- Gordon L. Clark, professor of geography at the University of Oxford
- Gordon Matta-Clark (1943–1978), American artist
