= Kai Ellice-Flint =

Australian surfer

Kai Ellice-Flint (born 1996) is a professional longboard surfer and surfboard shaper. In 2025 he was crowned the World Surf League longboarding world champion, riding a board he shaped himself.

== Early years ==
Ellice-Flint grew up in Avalon, Australia. He won the Australian under-18 longboard title at the Australian Longboard Titles in 2013.

== Professional surfing career ==
=== World Longboard Tour ===
In 2023, Ellice-Flint won the second event of the Australian Longboard Qualifying Series. He met his coach CJ Nelson after being knocked out of the competition. The following year, he narrowly missed qualifying for the WLT.

In 2025, Ellice-Flint received a wildcard onto the WLT. He claimed his first major tour victory in August 2025 at the Lexus US Open of Surfing at Huntington Beach, defeating four-time world champion Taylor Jensen in the men's longboard final. Ellice-Flint won first place in the Gold Coast and second place in Noosa, making him the number two seed. At the 2025 finals in El Salvador, Ellice-Flint defeated the top seed Edouard Delpero in the decider. His victory made him the eighth Australian to win a world longboard title.

== Titles ==
- 2025 World Longboard Champion
- 2025 Mens US Open of Surfing Longboarding Champion
- 2025 Noosa Festival of Surfing "Logger" Champion
- 2025 New Zealand Singlefin Mingle Champion
- 2025 Burleigh Heads Longboard Classic Champion
- 2013 Australian under 18s Longboarding Champion
