= Surf Crazy =

- Directed by: Bruce Brown
- Written by: Bruce Brown
- Produced by: Bruce Brown
- Starring: Bruce Brown; Pat Curren; Paul Gebauer
- Narrated by: Bruce Brown
- Cinematography: Bruce Brown
- Edited by: Bruce Brown
- Release date: 1959
- Running time: 72 minutes
- Country: United States
- Language: English

Surf Crazy is a 1959 film directed by Bruce Brown. His second surf film, it follows surfers to Mexico, Hawaii and California. Among the locations filmed was Velzyland in Hawaii, named for Brown's employer, surfboard manufacturer Dale Velzy.

== Cast ==
- Bruce Brown as Narrator
- Pat Curren as Self
- Paul Gebauer as Self
- Donald Takayama as Self
