= Richie Collins (surfer) =

American surfer and shaper

Richie Collins is a former professional surfer and shaper from Newport Beach, California. He established himself by winning the 1988 O'Neill Coldwater Classic in Santa Cruz and the 1989 US Open of Surfing in Huntington Beach. He finished as the number eight rated surfer in the world in 1989 and 1990.

== Personal life ==
His father is the shaper Lance Collins, and his daughter Meah Collins is a highly regarded surfer. He attended Newport Harbor High School. His nickname, given to him by Dave Parmenter, was 'Skeletor'.
