= Unsalted: A Great Lakes Experience =

- Directed by: Vince Deur
- Written by: Vince Deur
- Produced by: David Vander Veen
- Starring: Colin McPhillips, Bron Heussenstamm, Joe Curren
- Cinematography: Vince Deur
- Edited by: Vince Deur
- Release dates: 10 June 2005 (Toronto film festival); 26 June 2005
- Running time: 56 minutes
- Country: United States
- Language: English

Unsalted: A Great Lakes Experience is a 2005 56-minute film documenting four decades of lake surfing on the Great Lakes, directed by Vince Deur.

The film begins with videotape footage Deur recorded in November 1990, when he nearly drowned while surfing Lake Superior near Whitefish Point. Deur had been caught in a rip current for about an hour, trying futilely to swim to shore, before being suddenly released by the current. Back on dry land, he pledged on camera that he would one day make a film about surfing the great lakes. Unsalted combines home movies of lake surfing going as far back as the 1960s with contemporary footage culled from 150 hours of filming, often with surfing professionals brought in from California.

Principal photography wrapped on Jan. 22, 2005, when the director and several pro-surfers from the Ocean Pacific surf team reached the tip of Lake Superior, 24 kilometers northeast of Duluth, Minnesota, to encounter the "biggest, cleanest ... most ocean like wave" Deur had ever seen on a lake. The conditions that day became the climax of the film.

Unsalted premiered on June 10, 2005, in Newport Beach. It debuted in Canada on June 26 at the Fox Theatre in Toronto. The film would go on to screen at film festivals on four continents, with Deur becoming a contact person for surfers around the world who wanted to experience surfing the Great Lakes. The film was funded and executive produced by fellow surfer David Vander Veen.
