= Colin McPhillips =

American longboard surfrider

Personal information
- Nickname: Col
- Born: Colin Patrick McPhillips; 18 April 1975 (age 51) Santa Monica, California, United States of America
- Years active: 1992 - present
- Height: 6 ft 1 in (1.85 m)
- Weight: 165 lb (75 kg)

Surfing career
- Sport: Surfing
- Best year: Ranked 1st - 1999, 2001 and 2002, 3rd - 2000 ASP World Tour Ranking
- Sponsors: Oxbow (surfwear), Hobie Polarized sunglasses, Hobie Surfboards and Hobie Stand Up Paddleboards, Sex Wax, Rainbow footwear and Soleo Organics
- Major achievements: ASP Longboard World Champion (1999, 2001 & 2002); US Open of Longboarding (1994 & 2007); U.S. Pro Longboard Tour (2002, 2004, 2005). 5 times US Champion

Surfing specifications
- Stance: Natural
- Shapers: Bill Stewart, Hobie
- Quiver: 9'0" x 22 1/2" Board Dimensions
- Favorite waves: Jeffreys Bay, Indo and Middles
- Favorite maneuvers: Get barrelled or make a powerful rail turn, and carving roundhouse

Colin Patrick "Col" McPhillips (born 18 April 1975, Santa Monica, California) is an American professional longboard surfrider and three times ASP Longboard World Champion.

== Early years ==
Colin was raised in San Clemente, California, United States, where his parents taught him how to surf at the age of five. He started out as a shortboarder, finishing fourth place in the 1992 United States Surfing Championship in Huntington Beach, California. As a longboarder, he was more successful, Duke Boyd mentioned in his book Legends of Surfing that his shortboard style ripping methods and dynamic power moves proved successful in longboard competitions. He soon won the NSSA National longboard Championship for San Clemente High School in 1992 & 1993. His brother Iain won the NSSA Explorer Men’s event in 1996.

== Pro career ==
Colin won his first professional title winning the US Open of Longboarding in 1994. In October 1999, he defeated Marcelo Freitas from Brazil at One Mile Point, Australia to win his first ASP World Tour title. In 2000 he finished 3rd, but came back to win 2 world titles in a row by defeating local surfer Jason Ribbink in the final at J-Bay, South Africa in 2001 and in August 2002, he narrowly defeated Hawaiian Bonga Perkins to retain the world title at Cabo San Lucas, Mexico. In the same year he took the U.S. Pro Longboard Tour(2002, 2004, 2005). In 2007, he reclaimed the US Open of Longboarding title by defeating Taylor Jensen in the final. In 2009, he was nominated "O.C. Surfers of the Year".

== Other projects ==
Colin started out designing longboards for Stewarts. He currently designs longboards and paddle boards for Hobie and features in surf documentaries (see below for details).

== Results ==
- see Longboard Event Champions

== Documentaries ==
McPhillips featured in the following as himself:

- Tanked (2014) Hang Ten Barbeque air on Animal Planet
- Firsthand (TV series) (2003)Season 3 Episode 11 aired on Fuel TV
- Log:Redefine the Stereotype(2006)
- From This Day Forward(2005)
- Longboard Habit
- Fin (2005)
- Longboard Fever
- Wordz
- Unsalted: A Great Lakes Experience (2005)
- Costa Rica: Land of Waves (2001) (V)
- The Daily Habit: Colin McPhillips (#1.103)" (2006) TV Episode aired on Fuel TV
