= Chris Hawk =

American surfer and board shaper

Christopher Lee Hawk (February 16, 1951 – October 23, 2009) was an American surfer and surfboard shaper.

Hawk was born in Maywood, California, in 1951. During the 1980s, he became a surfboard shaper, and his boards were popular among locals in Orange County.

On September 18, 2009, Hawk was inducted into the Surfers' Hall of Fame in Huntington Beach. The induction normally takes place in July each year during the U.S. Open of Surfing, but Hawk's induction was moved forward because he was diagnosed with terminal oral cancer. Just over a month after the induction, Hawk succumbed to cancer and died on October 23 at his home in San Clemente.
