= Donald Takayama =

American Surfer

Personal information
- Nicknames: Fuzzy; Ehu-Hair; Bird's-nest; D.T.
- Born: Donald Moke Takayama; November 16, 1943
- Died: October 22, 2012 (aged 68) Waikiki, Hawaii, United States
- Height: 5 ft 3 in (1.60 m)
- Weight: 130 lb (59 kg)

Surfing career
- Sport: Surfing
- Best year: 1966 and 1967 U.S. Surfboard Championships (runner-up)
- Sponsors: Velzy/Jacobs
- Major achievements: Renowned surfboard shaper

Surfing specifications
- Stance: Goofy foot
- Shaper(s): Dale Velzy, Renny Yater, Pat Curren, Mike Diffenderfer, Ken Tilton, Hap Jacobs, Joe Quigg
- Favorite maneuvers: Nose ride

Donald Moke Takayama (November 16, 1943 – October 22, 2012) was an American professional surfer and surfboard shaper. Originally a longboard surfer, Takayama won the Master's division of the United States Surfing Champions in 1971, 1972 and 1973. Hawaiian born, Takayama learned to surf at Waikiki Beach and moved to California in the mid-1950s. Takayama died of complications from surgery; he is survived by his wife and four daughters.

== Early life and childhood ==
Takayama started surfing during his kindergarten year at Waikiki Beach on the south shore of Oʻahu, Hawaii. At 45 pounds, his 95-pound redwood surfboard was too heavy to carry home. Takayama decided he would have to keep his surfboard at the beach, so he buried it in the sand for safe keeping.

Well, the next day I was digging holes everywhere, and the oldtimers who played checkers in Kapiolani Park were looking at me, shaking their heads. I looked like a sand crab. Finally, I found a hole in the seawall and stuffed my little board in there. That's where I kept it all summer.

— Donald Takayama, SurfMuseum.org, written by Guy Motil

Dale Velzy discovered Takayama while surfing at Mākaha Beach. Velzy noted that none of the young surfers were attending school and told Takayama that if he ever got to the mainland, there would be a job waiting for him. Takayama bought a plane ticket to Los Angeles, at twelve years of age, with money saved from a newspaper delivery route. Takayama worked for Velzy/Jacobs Surfboards and lived in the loft of Dale Velzy's Venice, California surf shop.

After a harrowing ten-hour flight that landed at pre-L.A.X. Burbank Field, Takayama realized he'd landed on "a pretty big island." He made his way to Velzy's shop, and the rest is shaping history. Velzy recalls that his star surfer of the time, Dewey Weber, was "jealous as hell" of all the attention the young Hawaiian garnered upon his arrival, and Velzy's immediate worry was "Shit, I've wounded my team!" The two eventually became famous friends. D.T. worked his okole [butt] off for the Velzy/Jacobs label, and at the time, there was no heavier house. For that time and place, Donald was the equivalent of an artisan's apprentice in High-Renaissance Florence. In between frequent surf trips up and down the coast, Donald's only job was to shape balsa boards and surf with the crew at Hermosa Beach's 22nd Street.

— Donald Takayama, SurfMuseum.org, written by Guy Motil

== Career ==
Takayama may have been the world's first professional surfer. "Dale Velzy recalls that Donald's only job was to shape boards and surf at 22nd St. in Hermosa Beach, California... Velzy would give him five dollars and a T shirt with the company logo to go surfing." Takayama started shaping his own surfboards at nine years old and the purpose for the move to the mainland was so that he could establish himself as a surfboard shaper for Velzy/Jacobs Surfboards, "the undisputed leader in retail surfing". Takayama made a move to Jacobs Surfboards when Velzy bought Jacobs out of the partnership; Longboard Magazine named the 1965, Jacob's Donald Takayama model surfboard, "one of the most functional and aesthetically appealing boards ever made." According to Valerie J. Nelson of the Los Angeles Times, "Takayama-designed boards that once sold for as little as $100 have turned into sought-after collectibles that can go for $10,000 today." Takayama designed the David Nuuhiwa Noserider while at Bing surfboards in 1966, before moving on to Weber surfboards, where he and Harold Iggy created the Weber Performer.

Takayama shaped at Surfboards Hawaii in the late 1960s, and founded Hawaiian Pro Designs in the late 1970s in Encinitas, California, Takayama was shaping some shorter surfboards in the 1960s and could be seen riding his 5'10" any day it was breaking at Stone Steps in Encinitas, California, along with 1984 Pipeline Masters champion and Hawaiian Pro Designs' featured surfer Joey Buran. As the shortboard era progressed, Takayama refocused on longboards, creating the David Nuuhiwa and Dale Dobson models.

Takayama's career was interrupted in 1985. Takayama, along with more than sixty other persons, were charged with conspiracy to possess and distribute cocaine. After serving a little more than a year in Federal prison, Takayama was released in 1987, and resumed his career as a surfboard shaper and manufacturer.

"It was a major tragedy, and yet it was the best thing that could have possibly happened to me. It saved my life. The period of abusing myself had ended. The most horrible part was what it did to the people I loved … I had let them down." Donald recalls not the loneliness of the cell, but only the guilt of having hurt the ones he cared for most, people that had depended on him. "If I could say anything regarding drugs, it would be this: Before you make the casual decision to use, take a minute and think about your friends."

— Donald Takayama, Surf museum.org, "Daily Stokes", written by Guy Motil

In 1990, Takayama introduced Surfer's Choice, a teriyaki sauce derived from a family recipe. Takayama commented to Los Angeles Times, "Some people dunk doughnuts in it, others put it on their hash browns and eggs. One of my friends can't eat cottage cheese without it, and one guy wrote me saying he even drinks the stuff," Takayama said. Most people use it with fish, poultry and meat dishes either as a sauce or marinade. The Surfer's Choice label featured a graphic of Takayama nose riding a wave.

In the 1990s, longboards made a re-emergence. Now under Takayama's Hawaiian Pro Designs label, and located in North County, San Diego, Takayama along with eight time World Longboard champion, Joel Tudor produced functional and also collectible surfboards.

Among collectable boards was a series of wood alaias designed by Takayama and built by Floridian Brandon Russell in Oceanside, California from 2008 to 2010. Less than 50 of these functional replica surfboards were made, making them particularly sought after by collectors. Nearly half of this collection was shipped to Japan in 2009, and many of the others were built for team riders.

Hawaiian Pro Designs currently has dealers and offices in California, Texas, Hawaii, Europe, Taiwan, Australia and Canada.

== Surfing celebrity ==
=== Surfing cinema ===
According to Matt Warshaw, author of, The Encyclopedia of Surfing, writes that Takayama was, "...cited as the sport's original, and perhaps greatest, child phenomenon." Warshaw estimates that Takayama was in about a dozen surf movies, some surviving films are, Bruce Brown's, Surf Crazy in 1959, and Barefoot Adventure in 1960, feature appearances continued with On Safari to Stay in 1991 and Thomas Campbell's, The Seedling, in 1999.

=== Competition ===
Takayama placed 4th in the 1964 United States Surfing Association's year-end ratings, 3rd in 1965 and 1966, and 5th in 1967. Competing with the best surfers in the world. Takayama finished runner up to champion, Corky Carroll in the 1966 and 1967 United States Surfboard Championships. Takayama won the Master's division of the United States Surfing Champions in 1971, 1972 and 1973

== Honors and acknowledgement ==
Takayama was a well regarded waterman, an artist in his craft, and an ambassador to the sport of surfing.

- Takayama was hailed as one of the "25 Surfers Who Changed the Sport" in Surfer Magazine.
- Takayama was inducted into the International Surfing Hall of Fame in 1991.
- Takayama was honored and inducted into the Surfer's Walk of Fame in July 2007

Eulogies, with ceremonial paddle-outs were held on November 4, 2012, in Kugenuma, Japan, on November 10, 2012, at Kuhio Beach, Waikiki, Hawaii and at the Junior Seau Pier Amphitheater, in Oceanside, California. Guest speakers attending the Oceanside, California memorial services included, Paul Strauch, Nat Young, Skip Frye, and Joel Tudor.

Surfing has been my life. It's all I've done. It really doesn't matter how big or small the waves are. When you are out there surfing you are really competing with yourself. Let's say you are in a bad mood and you go out surfing, you catch one good wave and it makes your whole day – heck, it makes your whole week.

— "Donald Takayama", Liquid Salt Magazine, by Glenn Sakamoto
