= Taylor Jensen =

American surfer

Personal information
- Born: 3/9/84 Lake Tahoe

Surfing career
- Sport: Surfing
- Major achievements: ASP World Longboard Title; 2011,2012,2017,2024; US Open of Longboarding; 2003, 2008

Taylor Jensen (born 1984, Lake Tahoe) is an American professional longboard surfrider.

== Pro career ==
He is a 4X World Longboard Champion. Winning his first two World Longboard Championship titles in a row in 2011 & 2012 and won his third world title in 2017 and his 4th world title in 2024.

Jensen is a 6x North American Champion and a 3x Australasia Champion. He is also the 4 time US Open of Longboarding champion winning his first title in 2003. In 2006, he took the U.S. Pro Longboarding Championship Tour. In 2007, he finished runners-up to Colin McPhillips at the U.S. Open of Surfing. But, he reclaimed the title in 2008.

== Other Titles ==
- 2012,2014,2015,2016 ASP LQS 3-Star Australian Open of Longboarding Champion.
- 2012 ASP LQS 1-Star Hyundai Pro Sandy Bay Champion.
- 2011 ASP LQS 1-Star Malfunction Surf Festival & ASP Australasia LQS NSW Title.
- 2010, 2009 Noosa Festival of Surfing champion.
- 2009 PLA and Gidget PLA Pros.
- 2008 Costa Del Mar Pro Champion.
