= White Wash (film) =

- Film poster
- Directed by: Ted Woods
- Starring: Audwin Andersen; Tariq Trotter
- Narrated by: Ben Harper
- Release date: November 4, 2011
- Running time: 78 minutes
- Country: United States
- Language: English

White Wash is a 2011 American documentary film about black surfers, directed, produced, and written by Ted Woods. It documents the struggles of an African Americans being in a predominantly "white sport".

== Reception ==
The film gained positive reviews from critics.
