= Rabbit Kekai =

American surfer (1920-2016)

- Kekai in 1976
- Born: Albert Kekai; November 11, 1920; Honolulu, Hawaii, U.S.
- Died: May 13, 2016 (aged 95); Honolulu, Hawaii, U.S.
- Years active: c. 1925–2016
- Known for: Surfing
- Awards: Surfers' Hall of Fame (2012)

Albert "Rabbit" Kekai (November 11, 1920 – May 13, 2016) was an American surfer and one of the original innovators of modern surfing. He was a dominant master of the sport in the 1930s, 1940s, and 1950s, and was also a winner of the Peruvian and Makaha International titles.

== Early life ==
=== Learning to surf ===
Kekai was born in Honolulu, Hawaii, in 1920, and lived with his five siblings and parents near the shore at Waikiki. He first surfed at the age of three when his uncle, a lifeguard, began to teach him how to surf, and by the age of five, Kekai was surfing on his own. As surfing became a bigger part of his life, the boy looked to role models like Duke Kahanamoku, who instructed the ten-year-old Kekai in surfing and outrigger canoeing.

=== Teenage years ===
Although surfing was consuming more of his life as he grew older, Kekai managed to concentrate on his school work and excelled academically. He was offered athletic scholarships to attend college, but chose to enter the workforce after high school, and earned a living on and off the beach through numerous odd jobs.

By the mid-1930s, Kekai had risen in the ranks of surfing devotees as he innovated drop-knee bottom turns and hotdogging on shortboards, and surfed on finless boards called "hot curls". He is often mentioned as having been the top hot curl wave rider of his day. At this time he also began surfing on the North Shore, which is still a popular world-class surf spot.

== Prime surfing years ==
=== Duty in World War II ===
Like most young American men of the time, Kekai served in the military during World War II, and was fortunate to be stationed in Haleiwa on the North Shore for part of his service. Not wanting to let his surfing skills deteriorate, Kekai would surf after finishing his duties for the day. He worked on the Underwater Demolition Teams, or UDTs, that operated in the Pacific Theatre deploying depth charges to destroy Japanese ships and clear the way for American troops to capture the Federated States of Micronesia from Japan. After serving three years, Kekai was discharged from the Navy. He returned to Honolulu and worked in construction and as a longshoreman.

=== Return to surfing ===
Kekai was one of the founding members of the Waikiki Surf Club and helped it win numerous surfing championships and canoe races; he also won numerous international surfing titles independently. By the 1950s, Kekai made a point of passing on the surfing techniques he had acquired over the years to a younger generation, including Joey Cabell, Donald Takayama, Harold Iggy and many others. He also catered to celebrities who visited Hawaii on vacation, teaching them the basics of the ancient sport.

== Later years ==
Rabbit Kekai (center) with some of the children who competed in the 2009 Rabbit Kekai Keiki Surf Contest.

Rabbit Kekai was married and a great-grandfather, remaining an avid surfer until his death.

The Rabbit Kekai Keiki Surf Contest was held every year at Waikiki Beach to promote surfing for Hawaii's children (keiki means "child" or "little kid" in the Hawaiian language). Kekai attended the contests and presented the prizes to the winners.

In August 2012, Kekai was inducted into the Surfers' Hall of Fame in Huntington Beach, California.

Kekai died on May 13, 2016, at Leahi Hospital in Honolulu. He was 95.
