= Kanvas by Katin =

Kanvas By Katin
- Company type: Retail
- Industry: Retail/Wholesale
- Founded: 1954
- Founder: Nancy and Walter Katin
- Headquarters: Surfside, California
- Key people: Sato Hughes, Glenn Hughes, Jesse Watson
- Products: Apparel, Accessories, Surfboards
- Website: [N/A]

Kanvas By Katin, founded in 1954 and located in Surfside, California, is one of the oldest surf shops in California.

== Katin history ==
In the late 1950s, Nancy and Walter Katin were in the business of making canvas boat covers. One day a young Corky Carroll came into the Katin's shop complaining of the difficulty in finding a pair of swim shorts durable enough to stand up to the then-new pastime of surfboard riding. Walter used his sewing machine and some of the sturdy boat canvas previously used for boat covers and created the first pair of Kanvas by Katin surf trunks.

The Katins kept making their surf trunks, selling them from the Surfside store and through a hemisphere-wide network of surf shop dealers. From the 1960s through the 1970s, many top surfers were loyal customers and appeared in surf magazine ads wearing them. Walter Katin died in 1967, and Nancy continued to run the shop and the business in the same manner as before.

In 1977, just as professional surfing was starting to take off, Nancy Katin initiated an annual Pro/Am Team Challenge at the Huntington Beach Pier. With many of the world's best surfers coming to compete, winning the Katin Team Challenge became a prestigious accomplishment in the surfing world. By the late 1970s, the surf industry had begun a decade of explosive growth, but Katin continued to run the business as before. Her health began to decline in the early 1980s, just as surf wear was gaining mass popularity, and other manufacturers began take advantage of the trend, aggressively marketing their products with slick advertising and worldwide promotional blitzes. Katin, however, continued to sew surf trunks in the back room of the Surfside store, selling them up front and through the same loyal network of surf shops.

In 1986 Nancy Katin died. The Katins had no children, and Nancy left the business to her friend and seamstress, Sato Hughes, who had begun sewing trunks for the couple in 1961. Along with her son Glenn, Sato continued to run the Katin operation in the same low-key manner. They focused on the retail store and on maintaining the quality of Katin surf trunks.

By the early 1990s, the big surf wear market had "shaken out" and hardcore surfers were again looking for a pair of functional, durable trunks. Glenn and Sato held down the retail end, while two Newport Beach surfers, Bill and Rick, who had experience in marketing, sales and production, took over the wholesale side of the business. They started by updating the classic canvas designs with nylon material and adjusting the lengths and fit for a modern clientele. They added shorts, shirts, pants and jackets to the product line, and with the new samples in hand, set off on a tour of surf shops in coastal cities in the United States. They were met by an enthusiastic response from shop proprietors, who found that sales were strong

Glenn and Sato now focused their efforts on the Katin shop. They filled it with clothing, wetsuits, skateboards, surfboards, body boards and accessories, while surf shop walls were adorned with photos, trophies and other memorabilia spanning decades of surfing history.

In 1998 Bill and Rick sold the wholesale side of the business to K2 Sports, and inaugurated the merger with Bill's brainchild, the "K2 Big Wave Challenge" (later known as the "Swell XXL", and now as the "Billabong XXL"). The K2 buyout soon led to the principals migrating to other ventures and finally the demise of the Katin wholesale business. Glenn Hughes fought to reacquire the name for many years. In 2000 Nancy Katin was inducted into the Surfing Walk of Fame in Huntington Beach as Woman of the Year. In 2005, Glenn Hughes, with partner Robert Schmidt, regained the right from K2 to once again sell wholesale under the Katin name. On July 4 of the same year, Glenn Hughes with online partner Rod Kelsey launched a new website, KatinSurf.com, replacing prior URLs Katin-Surf.com (2006) Katin.com (1998) and KanvasByKatin.com (2000).
