= Clark Foam =

American surfboard manufacturer

Clark Foam was a Californian company that manufactured surfboard blanks — foam slabs, reinforced with one or more wooden strips or "stringers" — cast in the rough shape of a surfboard and used by surfboard shapers to create finished surfboards. Founded in 1961 by Gordon "Grubby" Clark, Clark Foam established a near-monopoly on the American market, and a strong presence in the international market, which it held until the company's unexpected closure in 2005.

== Gordon "Grubby" Clark ==
Clark Foam was founded in 1961 by Gordon "Grubby" Clark. Clark was born on January 19, 1933, in Gardena, California. He surfed on heavy redwood surfboards in the 1940s and 1950s.

At age 19, Clark worked for Tom Blake, a legendary figure who invented the surfboard fin. To help pay for his post-secondary education, Clark began to work in 1955 as a glasser at Hobie Surfboards, for surfboard pioneer Hobie Alter. Glassing is a complex job in which a surfboard blank is laminated, coated, assembled, and finished with multiple layers of dry- and wet-sanding, before receiving its final coatings. Clark graduated from Pomona College in 1957 with a B.S. in engineering, having studied chemistry, math and physics.

Hobie Alter soon set up a separate operation in Laguna Canyon experimenting with polyurethane surfboard blanks as an alternative to balsa wood. He put Clark in charge of it. They released the first foam-core board to hit the market in June, 1958. With the release of the surfing-themed movie Gidget in 1959, surfing became more popular. Clark was soon manufacturing 250 blanks a week for Alter.

== Founding ==
In 1961, Clark set up his own company, Clark Foam. Originally located in Laguna Canyon, it later moved to Laguna Niguel. Clark introduced a number of innovations in the production of surfboard blanks, including the use of steel reinforced cement molds, hydraulic glue presses, hot coating, and the use of computers in the manufacturing process.

Clark's new foam designs were essential to the "shortboard revolution". New materials such as polyurethane foam, polyester resin, and fiberglass were used to redesign the shape of the board and to shrink its size from 300 cm (10 ft) to 180 or 210 cm (6 or 7 ft). Clark's catalogue eventually offered customers more than 70 shapes of blanks, in 8 densities, incorporating 4 different woods for stringers. Customers could choose from a library of 5,000 rocker templates.

== Impact ==
For decades Clark's company exercised a near-monopolistic control over the market. At the time of its 2005 closing Clark Foam provided about 90% of the United States supply and 60% of the world supply of surfboard blanks.

== Closure ==
On December 5, 2005, Gordon Clark abruptly shut down Clark Foam, then worth about $40 million, and began destroying his molds and equipment, citing difficulties with government regulatory agencies over the chemicals and equipment he used and claims filed against him by former employees. Clark Foam used toluene diisocyanate (TDI) in the manufacturing process, one of the last California manufacturers to do so, and the United States Environmental Protection Agency (EPA) had threatened to shut down the company in the past. In a seven-page fax, Clark cited several issues pending with the EPA as his reason for shutting down, although no known action was under way against him.

The abrupt closing of Clark Foam sent shockwaves through the industry and left surfboard shapers scrambling for new suppliers. Since Clark Foam closed, surfboard manufacturing has turned to new and innovative materials, such as carbon-fiber-reinforced polymer, hollow blanks, and new "flex" materials used by other various companies.
