= Rell Sunn =

American surfer (1950–1998)

Personal information
- Born: July 31, 1950 Mākaha, Hawaii
- Died: January 2, 1998 (aged 47) Mākaha, Hawaii

Surfing career
- Sport: Surfing

Rell Kapolioka'ehukai Sunn (July 31, 1950 – January 2, 1998) was an American world surfing champion. Known as "Queen of Makaha" and "Aunty Rell", she was a pioneer in the world of women's surfing.

== Early life ==
Rell Kapolioka'ehukai Sunn was born on July 31, 1950, in Mākaha, Hawaii. Her middle name, which means "the heart of the sea," was given to her by her grandmother. Legally born Roella, a combination of her parents' names—Roen and Elbert—Sunn disliked it, eventually changing it legally to Rell. Sunn's father was a beach boy, a term for men who were some mix of a lifeguard, surfing instructor, and tourist guide. She began surfing at the age of 4.

== Career ==
Sun was Hawaii's number one female amateur surfer for five years. She was Hawaii's first female lifeguard. In 1966, she accompanied Duke Kahanamoku on a trip to California to attend a world championship, and began traveling around the world to compete professionally. With Mary Setterholm, Jericho Poppler, and MaryLou Drummy, Sunn co-founded the Women's International Surfing Association (WISA) in 1975, the first women's pro circuit. In 1979, she, along with Jericho Poppler, Lynne Boyer, Margo Oberg, Cherie Gross, Linda Davoli, Debbie Beacham, Becky Benson and Brenda Scott, formed Women's Pro Surfing (WPS) with pro women. In 1982, Sunn ranked number one in the world on longboard.

== Cancer battle and death ==
In 1982, during a pro surf meet in Huntington Beach, California, Sunn felt a lump in her breast while drying off during the competition; it turned out to be advanced stage breast cancer. At age 32, she was diagnosed and given a prognosis of one year. Sunn continued to surf daily despite the pain from bouts of chemotherapy, radiation treatments, medications and the financial toll associated with the disease. Following her diagnosis, Sunn became a radio disc jockey and surf reporter, a physical therapist at a Waianae care home, and a counselor at a cancer research center. She helped pilot a program for breast cancer awareness at the Wai'anae Cancer Research Center that involved educating local women about the causes and prevention of breast cancer. Over the next 14 years, her cancer went into remission three times, and she underwent a mastectomy and a bone marrow transplant but the disease eventually spread to her brain.

Rell Sunn died on January 2, 1998, aged 47. More than 3,000 people attended her memorial service, where her ashes were scattered in the ocean off her native Makaha.

== Family ==
Sunn moved to Oklahoma with her then boyfriend sometime in the late 1960s, got married, and had one daughter, Jan Sunn-Carreira. By 1972 her marriage failed, and she and her daughter returned to Hawaii. After a five-year hiatus from surfing, she returned to surf. By 1995, she got remarried to her third husband, Dave Parmenter, a professional surfer and board shaper.

== Legacy ==
In 1996, Sunn was the topic of the song "Mother Of The Sea" by Hawaiian singer/songwriter Darren Benitez. In 1997, an award-winning documentary about Sunn's life, Heart of the Sea, was filmed by Charlotte Lagarde and Lisa Denker. In 2010 a book, Stories of Rell Sunn: Queen of Mākaha, was published. Dave Wronski, lead guitarist of Slacktone, composed an instrumental surf rock tune, "Rell Sunn Aloha", in her honor.

During her battle with breast cancer in the 1980s, Sunn began her own surf contest, Rell Sunn Menehune Surf Contest, which is annually held in her hometown of Makaha, Oahu in the hopes of encouraging surfing sportsmanship and environmental awareness in a community that experiences a high juvenile delinquency rate.

== Accolades ==
In August 1996, she was inducted into the Surfing Walk of Fame as that year's Woman of the Year; the Walk is in Huntington Beach, California.

== Filmography ==
Year	Title	Role	Notes
1998	Blue Crush	Herself - Surfer	
