= David Nuuhiwa =

American surfer

Personal information
- Born: July 23, 1948 (age 77) Oahu, Hawaii, Territory of Hawaii (now U.S.)
- Years active: 1952–present
- Height: 6 ft 2 in (1.88 m)
- Website: nuuhiwasurf.com

Surfing career
- Sport: Surfing
- Best year: 1972
- Sponsors: Oxbow
- Major achievements: Surfing Walk of Fame 2005 Surf Champion, 2001 Local Hero

Surfing specifications
- Stance: Goofy
- Shaper: Donald Takayama
- Quiver: Long Noseriders, Twin-Fin Fishes
- Favorite waves: Tavarua, Fiji
- Favorite maneuvers: Noseriding

David Kealohalani Nuuhiwa III (more commonly known as David Nuuhiwa; born 1948) is an American Hawaiian surfer.

== Life ==
Nuuhiwa was born in 1948 in Honolulu, Hawaii, Territory of Hawaii. He is the son of a Waikiki beachboy and martial arts instructor, and began surfing at age five, one year after his mother died. He moved to Southern California in 1961, with his father David Nuuhiwa II.

David Nuuhiwa is known for his soulful noseriding. Often perched at the tip of his board for 20 seconds or more. Nuuhiwa's smooth and fluid style established him winning the May 10th 1966 international championship in San Diego.

Nuuhiwa continued to win contests following the shortboard era, such as the 1971 U.S. Surfing Championships. By this time Nuuhiwa had transitioned from his longboards to shortboards, favoring twin-fin fishes. He continued to win competitions and make projects, most notably surfing in Rainbow Bridge (1971), a film starring Jimi Hendrix. Nuuhiwa later starred in Five Summer Stories (1972).
