= Doc Ball =

American surfer and surf photographer

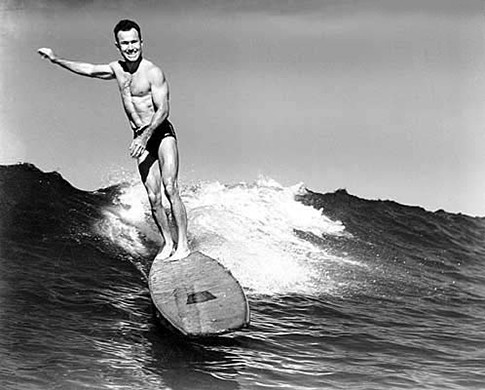
John Heath "Doc" Ball surfing

John Heath "Doc" Ball (January 25, 1907 – December 5, 2001) was an American surfer and surf photographer. Ball invented a waterproof housing to fit around his camera to better capture surfing photographs. The images were prominent enough to be featured in the likes of Life magazine and the Los Angeles Times newspaper. Ball collected his images in one of the first photography books on surfing, California Surfriders: 1946.

== Early life and family background ==
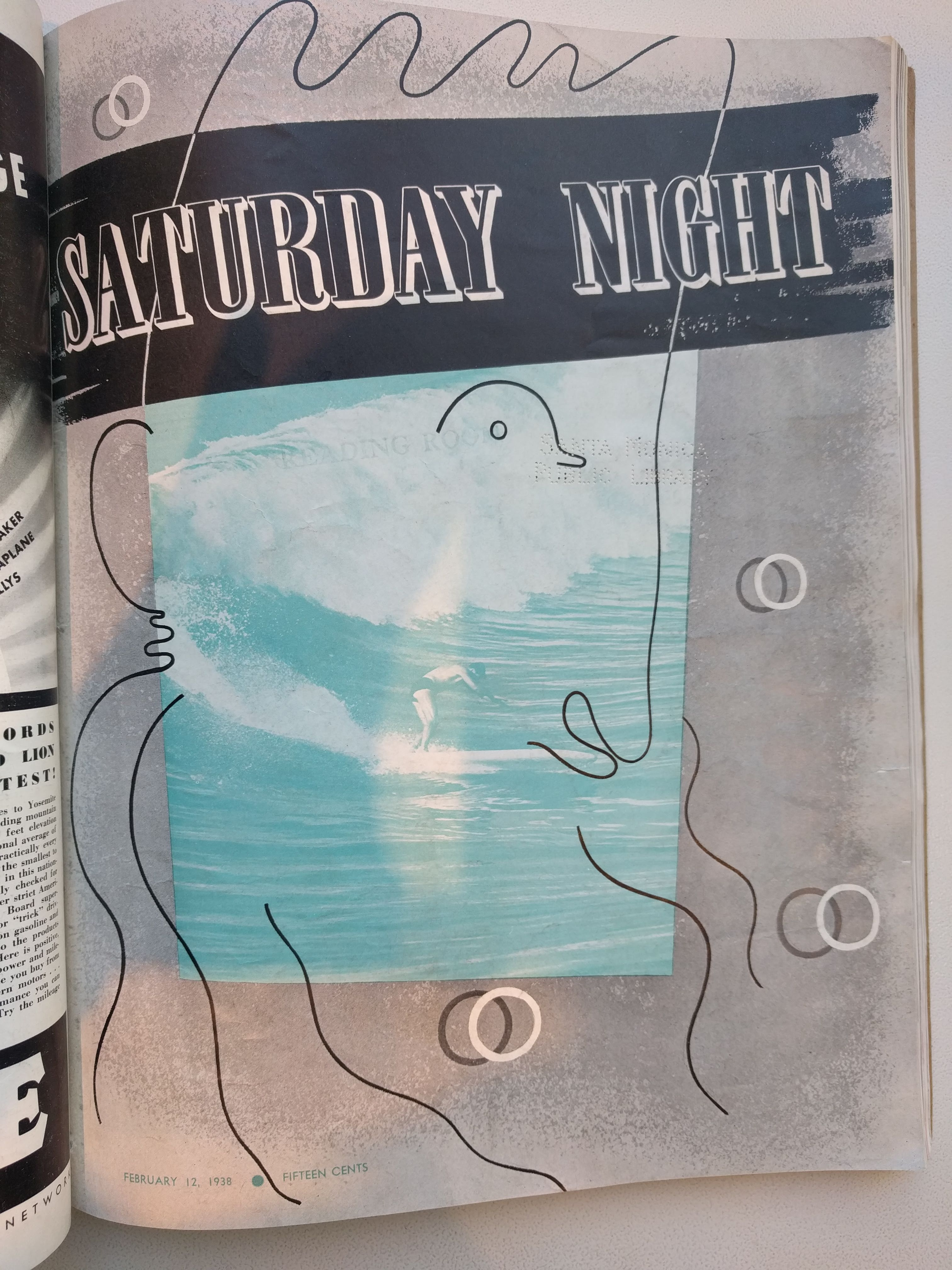
Image taken by Doc Ball for the cover of Saturday Night magazine (February 12, 1938).

Ball was born in Los Angeles, California. Ball's mother Genevieve was a natural child psychologist, and his father Archibald E. Ball was a dentist. Ball revolutionized surf photography and surf culture. His family came from the Midwest, and he always had a passion for tinkering. He was always a good athlete, participating in football and pole vault. He ended up working as a dentist (he opened his practice in 1934), hence the nickname “Doc.” Though Ball was a good surfer in his own right, his main contributions came in the form of surf photography. Ball invented a waterproof camera housing, which is displayed in the California Surf Museum. Many of Ball's pictures ended up in notable publications such as Life Magazine. One of Ball's greatest achievements was his book California Surf Riders: 1946. This book featured a trove of surfing pictures from the pre-World War Two era. Ball married in 1941. He had two kids: Norman, and John Jr.

== The Palos Verdes Surfing Club ==
Ball was one of the founding members of the Palos Verdes Surf Club along with Adie Bayer. The club was founded in 1935. The Palos Verdes Surfing Club was one of the first and most influential of the early California surf clubs. A product of the period, the surf club was all-male. Ball's pictures of Bluff Cove, where he and the other club members liked to surf, help put Palos Verdes Estates on the map as a destination to watch the new sport from its cliffs. Ball and his crew were inspired by the Waikiki beach boys whom they modeled themselves after. Like the Hawaiians, club members engraved nicknames like "Granny" and "Hoppy" onto their surfboards.

Bluff Cove was regarded as one of the best surf spots along the California coast and appeared in the pamphlets of the Palos Verdes Homes Association to advertise their suburb. This Cove was hard to reach, perhaps adding to its appeal to surfers despite the difficulties of driving down the steep cliff road. Ball had a history with Bluff Cove that went back to his childhood and referred to the break as "Little Waikiki."

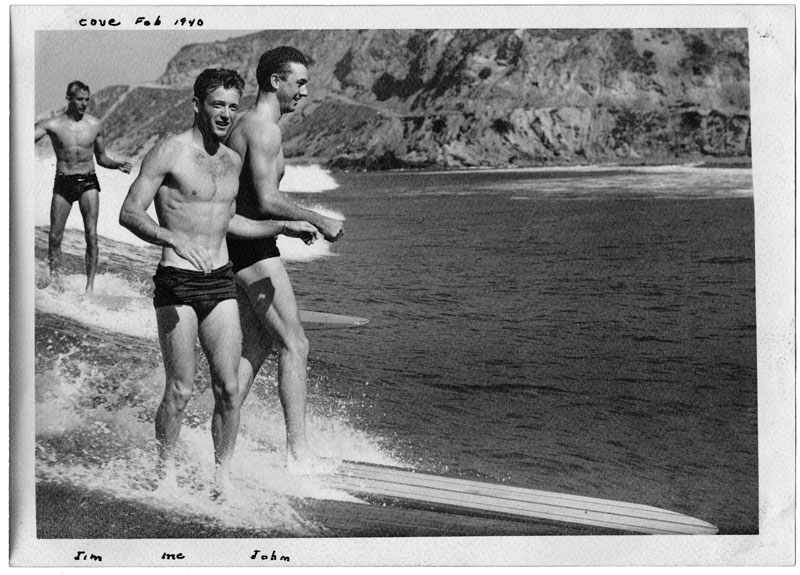
Members of the Palos Verdes Surf Club

Ball was also the editor of the Palos Verdes Surfing Club newsletter--Ye Weekly Super Illustrated Spintail—which he handed out at the club's meetings in Los Angeles, where Ball ran his dental practice. Ball was also the one who developed the club's constitution and by-laws which described their fraternal core values as “courage, honor, and service." There were requirements for new members, financial rules, fines for missing meetings, and the initiation of pledges. Ball edited the newsletter for 4 years, showcasing his desire to build community among the young surfers.

== Surfing photography contributions ==
Ball had an interest in photography since he was a child, when his father gave him his first camera.

In January 1931, Ball saw a surfing photo taken by Tom Blake in the Los Angeles Times that inspired him. Ball thought he could take similar photos at beaches near him.

Ball's work was soon published in newspapers and magazines, spreading the image of California beach culture throughout the country. His first publication was in the Los Angeles Times newspaper in 1937, which had portrayed surfing as existing in California but mostly being done in Hawai`i. However, when he was published in Life magazine in 1938, the magazine acknowledged the growing surfing culture in California. One of Ball's photos was also featured on the cover of Saturday Night magazine in 1938.

In August 1939, an action photo of surfer Jim Bailey with his dog surfing at San Onofre appeared in the Los Angeles Times and inspired Ball to create his waterproof camera box to take similar photos. He used his dental tools to fashion a box with small openings that could be quickly closed when the waves came. The photographer could open the coverings over the lens, take a photo, and close them again before the waves hit.

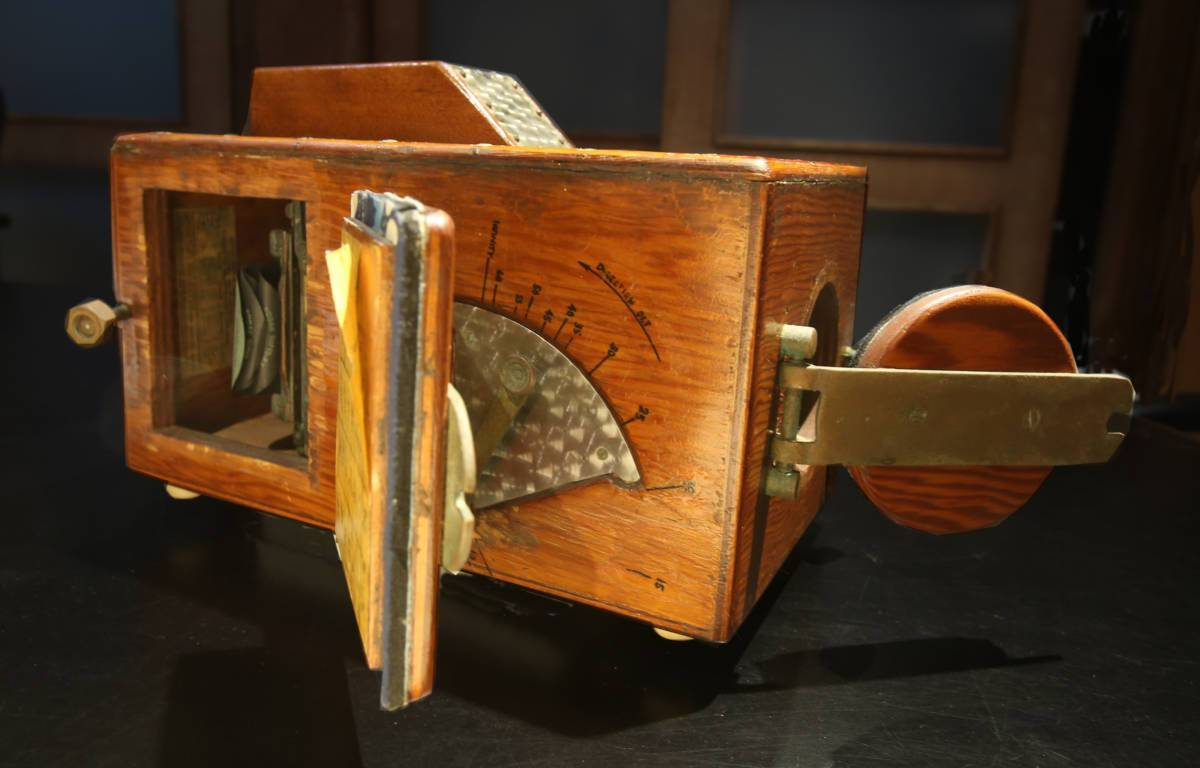
Doc Ball's underwater camera box (California Surf Museum)

Ball published California Surfriders: 1946 to showcase the sport in California. The book featured Ball's own photos as well as several from other photographers, whose pictures covered areas that Ball was not as familiar with.
