= Mike Doyle (surfer) =

American surfer

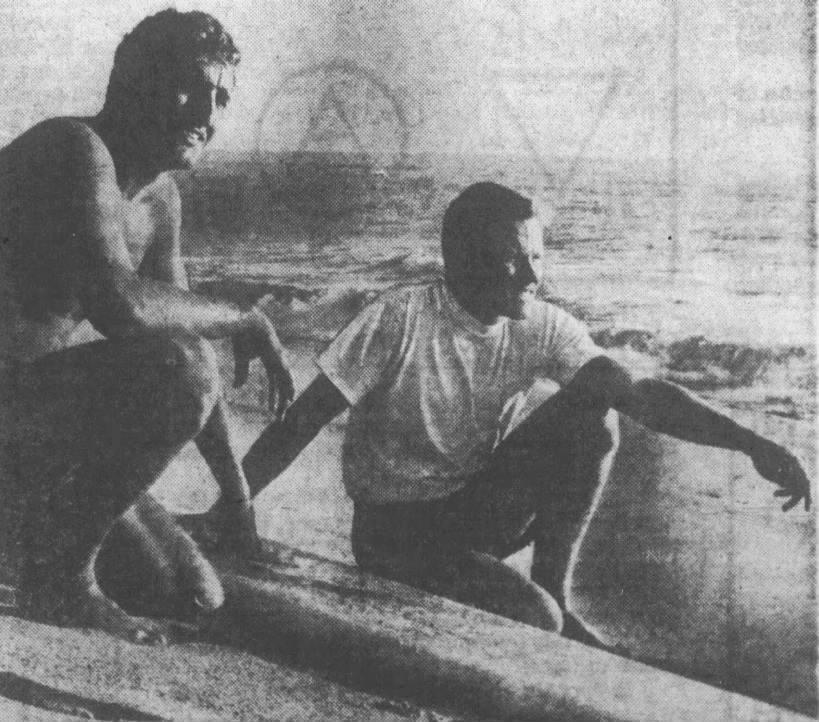
- Doyle (left) with Corky Carroll, 1964

Personal information
- Born: March 7, 1941 Lawndale, California, U.S.
- Died: April 30, 2019 (aged 78) San José del Cabo, Mexico

Surfing career
- Sport: Surfing

Mike Doyle (March 7, 1941 – April 30, 2019), also known as Malibu Mike, was an American surfer.

== Life and career ==
Doyle was born in Lawndale, California. At the age of thirteen, he began surfing.

Doyle was a runner-up at the 1964 World Surfing Championships.

In 1966, Doyle was named as Number One Surfer in the World by the Surfer Magazine.

Doyle died on April 30, 2019, at his home in San José del Cabo, Mexico, at the age of 78.
