= Buzzy Trent =

Pioneer of big wave surfing

Personal information
- Born: May 13, 1929 San Diego, California, United States
- Died: September 26, 2006 (aged 77)

Surfing career
- Sport: Surfing

Surfing specifications
- Stance: Regular (natural foot)

Buzzy Trent (born "Goodwin Murray Trent Jr", May 13, 1929 – September 26, 2006) was an American pioneer of big wave surfing. Born in San Diego and raised in Santa Monica, he body-surfed as a child and started surfing at age 12. He moved to Hawaii in 1952 to surf and pioneered big wave surfing along with George Downing and Greg Noll. Buzzy gained international fame in 1953 when he was photographed by Scoop Suzuki riding a 20-foot winter wave at Mākaha in the first widely published photos of big wave surfing.

Throughout his life he was an athlete, including being an all-state football player. He was also an active diver and hang glider.

Buzzy was featured in the 2004 documentary film Riding Giants, directed and narrated by Stacy Peralta.

He died on September 26, 2006, at Hale Ho Aloha nursing home in Honolulu, HI at age 77.
