= Bob Simmons (surfer) =

American surfer

Robert Wilson Simmons (March 29, 1919 – September 26, 1954) was an American surfer and surfboard shaper, considered to be the father of the modern surfboard. There were two primary schools of thought at that time concerning surfboard shape. Simmons championed the round bottom board. The other school, flat bottom, ultimately prevailed, primarily because of its ability to hold a board in a steep wave. Round bottom boards tended to "spin out" of such wave faces.

Simmons was born in Los Angeles, California. During his early teens, he developed a tumor on his left ankle which nearly caused his leg to be amputated. After beating the cancer, Bob was involved in a serious motorcycle collision. He studied mathematics at the California Institute of Technology but dropped out.

While staying in the hospital he was advised to try surfing. He first rode a surfboard at age 20 at Newport Beach, California. Simmons was also famous for being one of the first to incorporate fiberglass and polyester resin to create a lightweight, durable surfboard.

In 1954, Simmons drowned while surfing at Bird Rock in San Diego, California.
