= Shane Beschen =

American surfer (born 1972)

Personal information
- Born: February 18, 1972 (age 54) San Clemente, California, U.S.

Surfing career
- Sport: Surfing
- Best year: 2nd 1996 ASP World Tour

Surfing specifications
- Stance: Regular (natural foot)

Shane Beschen (born February 18, 1972) is a California (USA) born professional surfer.

== Biography and career ==
Shane Beschen was born on February 18, 1972 to Mike and Sue Beschen. His mother is an elementary school teacher, and his brother Gavin is a professional surfer as well. At 16 years old, Beschen signed his first sponsorship deal and started to tour as a pro surfer. His mother recalled he would attend school for a couple of weeks, and then take off for a couple of weeks, taking "independent-study contracts", and doing his homework while flying to his events. By 1998, he had won more than $250,000 in competitions.

In 1996, at Kirra, Beschen became the first and only professional surfer to score three perfect 10 point rides for a total 30 out of 30 ASP three-wave scoring system. In May 1996, he knocked Sunny Garcia from his number one spot in world rankings, at the Marui Pro surfing tournament at Torami Beach, Japan. In 2003, after a five year dry spell of not winning any events, he won the Faith Riding Pro, the opening event on the 2003 Hawaiian Pro-Am Circuit. In May 2005 in the final of the Billabong Pro Teahupoo, Kelly Slater became the first to score two perfect rides for a total 20 out of 20 under the newer ASP two-wave scoring system, matched by Joel Parkinson in the 2008 Billabong Pipeline Masters third-round heats.

== Sources ==
- Shane Beschen Interview
- Influences: Shane Beschen
