= Sharron Weber =

American surfer

Sharron Weber, an American surfer, won the women's world surfing championship in 1970 when it was held in Australia. She was the fifth women to hold that title. In 1972, Sharron Weber won the International Surfing Federation's (which was later replaced by the International Surfing Association) surfing world championship. She was inducted into the Surfing Walk of Fame as that year's Woman of the Year in 2013; the Walk is in Huntington Beach, California.
