= George Downing (surfer) =

American surfer (1930–2018)

George Downing (May 2, 1930 – March 5, 2018) was an American surfer based in Hawaii. In 1951, he created the first surfboard with a removable fin.

== Early life ==
Downing, of Irish-American background, was born and raised in Honolulu, Hawaii Territory, where he learned to surf at the age of nine. He took a route as a paper boy and bought his first surfboard from a homeowner along his route. By 1942, his uncle Wally Froiseth took him around the islands to surf.

== Career ==
Downing noticed that surfers were becoming reckless and getting injured after trying to surf 25-foot waves. Consequently, Downing built "The Rocket", a surfboard with a removable fin, and thus revolutionized the surfboard and surfing. This redwood board is considered the first real big-wave gun, a board able to ride a large wave. With this board, Downing competed in and won the 1954 Makaha International Surfing Championship and appeared in multiple movies. When he wasn't competing, he accepted a teaching placement at the Outrigger Canoe Club, where he met his future wife, Gildea. In total, Downing won the Makaha International Surfing Championship three times; 1954, 1961, and 1965.

After leaving Outrigger Canoe Club, Downing opened his own surf shop in Kaimuki, which later earned him the Legacy Award from the Hawaii Tourism Authority. He later competed in the 1965 World Championships, where he finished seventh, and the 1968 Peru International where he came third. From there, he turned to coaching where he led Hawaii to the 1968 World Surfing Championship Title.

In 2011, Downing was inducted into the Surfers' Hall of Fame alongside Taylor Knox and Chuck Linnen. He died in March 2018 at the age of 87.
