= John Whitmore (surfer) =

South African surfer

John Whitmore (30 March 1929 – 24 December 2001) pioneered the sport of surfing in South Africa.

His early career as an abalone and crayfish diver put him close to the ocean. After having read about surfing in Hawaii in the late fifties, John became so enthused by the prospect of surfing that he set off to build his own surfboards. This led to the sport of surfing being introduced in South Africa, at Muizenberg and Sea Point. Affectionately known to Capetonians as "die oom" (the uncle), Whitmore gave daily surf reports from his sea-front home bathroom window. Refer to The Endless Summer II surf film.
