= Dewey Weber =

American surfer (1938–1993)

David Earl Weber (August 18, 1938, in Denver, Colorado – January 6, 1993), known as Dewey Weber, was an American surfer, a popular surfing film subject, and a successful surfboard manufacturing businessman. Throughout the 1950s and 1960s, he distinguished himself with a surfing style unique at the outset of that era. Out of the water, he had already become a national yo-yo champion and a CIF champion in wrestling, then appeared in several feature films, and eventually established a successful surfboard manufacturing company. On November 14, 2015, the city of Hermosa Beach unveiled at its Community Center a sculpture inspired by a photo of Dewey Weber taken by surf photographer Leroy Grannis.

== Early years ==
Weber was an only child in a German working-class family. He learned early about the water at his lifeguard-babysitter's nearby swimming pool. His father, Earl, was a truck driver. His mother, Gladys, worked at Denver's Nabisco cracker factory. When Weber was five, his family moved to Manhattan Beach, in California.

When he was eight, his mother took him to an audition at which he won the part of Buster Brown, a comic book character adopted by the Brown Shoe Company.

The local surf club included such relatively well-known surfers as Dale Velzy, Bob Hogan, and Barney Biggs, the last of whom noticed Weber first, and lent him a surfboard when Weber was only nine.

When Weber was fourteen, Groucho Marx featured him on his national television show You Bet Your Life, as the three-time National Duncan Yo-Yo Champion.

Weber's short, stocky frame (5'3", 130 pounds) helped him to earn a varsity letter in wrestling in his very first year of high school. By the time he graduated from Mira Costa High School in 1956, Weber had become a three-time westling champion. He became an All-State performer at El Camino College, and although he subsequently qualified for the Olympic wrestling team, an injury immediately before the games prevented him from competing.

== Surfing ==
Weber caught the eye of one of the best-known surfers and surfboard makers of that time, Dale Velzy, who advertized his surfboards by sponsoring surfers to ride them. During Weber's work for Velzy, the surfer sought to find a way to surf in Hawaii. He worked as a lifeguard at the Biltmore Hotel and saved money for his first trip to those islands.

Weber perfected his personal surfing style in Hawaii. His intricate footwork up and down the board, quite unlike the prevailing style, earned him the nickname, "The Little Man on Wheels." Bud Browne's 1957 film, The Big Surf chronicled Weber's first visit to Hawaii. An image from that film of Weber surfing Makaha became the symbol of the United States Surfing Association. Weber appeared in nearly every surfing movie of the late 1950s and the 1960s, including Slippery When Wet (1958), Cat on a Hot Foam Board (1959), and Walk on the Wet Side (1963).

== Popular culture ==
In the 1973 George Lucas film American Graffiti, Mackenzie Phillips' character, Carol, wears a white T-shirt with a Dewey Weber logo on it.

In the 2019 film Ford v Ferrari, a Dewey Weber store is seen across the street from main character Carroll Shelby's car dealership, set in 1965 Southern California.

== Business activities ==
In 1960, following Weber's return to California from Hawai'i, he founded Weber Surfboards in Venice Beach, where he began producing boards with such names as the "Weber Performer" and the "Weber Pig." Weber hired his highly regarded shaper, Harold Iggy, and assembled a surfing team, which he sent to surfing events attired in distinctive red Weber trunks and jackets to promote the Weber brand. The success of his surfing team led Weber Surfboards at the time to sales second only to Hobie. Between 1966 and 1967, Weber sold roughly 10,000 "Performers" throughout every coast in the country. Weber opened stores in Hermosa Beach, San Diego, and Honolulu.

With the fall in popularity of the long board, the business eventually shrank to a single shop. Although Weber remained in the business and was best known for his longboard designs, he produced some short boards allegedly excellent too.

In accord with his love of the ocean, he built a two-man swordfishing boat and spent much of his time at sea. He died on January 6, 1993, of heart failure. His death was widely reported in both the printed and the broadcast press.

Weber's widow Caroline, and his sons Shea and Corey, revived the business together and continue to operate, in San Clemente.

Shea opened a new Dewey Weber retail location in San Luis Obispo in 2020 selling New Surfboards, Tshirts/soft goods, and accessories.
