= Lynne Boyer =

American surfer

Lynne Boyer is a two-time world surfing champion from the United States. She won her two titles in 1978 and 1979. It was the first time any woman had won the championship twice. She was inducted into the Surfing Walk of Fame in Huntington Beach, California in 2008, as that year's Woman of the Year.

After her surfing career, she turned to painting.
