= Joyce Hoffman =

American surfer

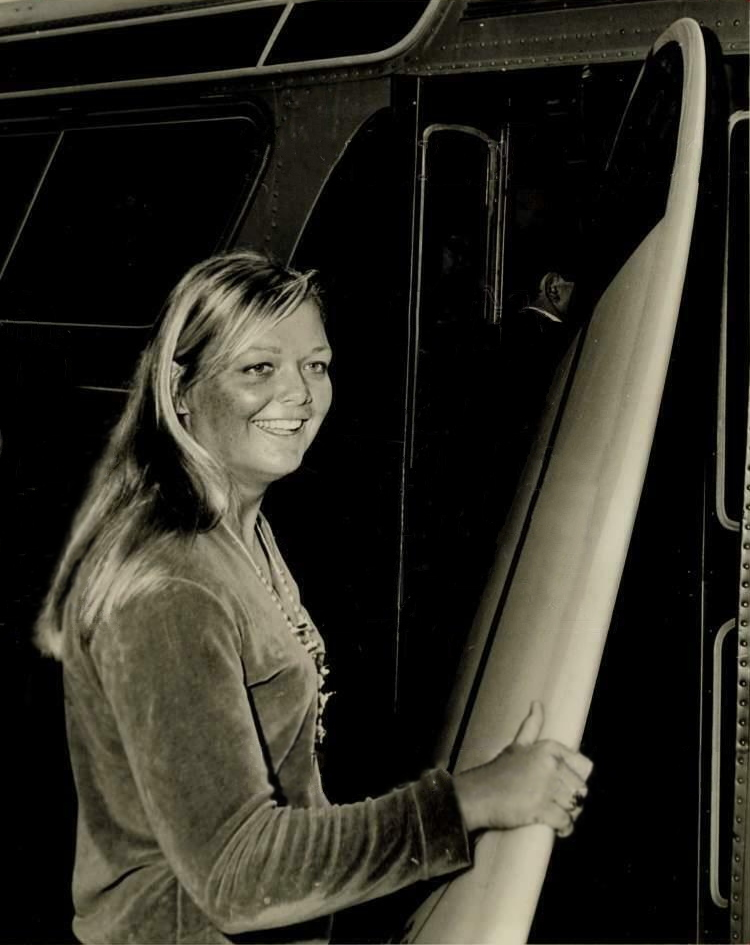
Joyce Hoffman in 1968

Joyce Hoffman (born 1946/47) is an American surfer, considered a pioneer in her sport. She is often regarded as the first female international surfing star and was one of the first inductees of the International Surfing Hall of Fame.

Born in Dana Point, California, Hoffman started competing at an early age. She went on to win numerous honors including the US Surfing Championship for Women from 1965–67 and 1971, and the Makaha International Open in 1964 and 1966. Also that year she won the U.S. Women's championship (held in Huntington Beach), the World Championship (held in Lima, Peru) and the International Women's Surfing Championship (held in Makaha). In 1968 she became the first woman to surf the Banzai Pipeline in Hawaii.

She has also been a leading female motocross rider.

Hoffman appeared as herself in the June 28, 1965 episode of To Tell the Truth, receiving two of the four possible votes.

Her aunt is actress Dolores Reed.

== Awards and Honors ==
In 1965, she was named LA Times Woman of the Year, making her the only surfer to ever win this honor.

In 1966 she was voted best woman surfer in the world by the International Surfing Hall of Fame.[1]

In 1966 and 1967, Hoffman was the top vote getter for Surfing Magazine International Hall of Fame Awards.

In 1994 Hoffman was inducted into the Surfing Walk of Fame as 1994 Woman of the Year, Huntington Beach, California.

In 2022 the City of Dana Point honored Joyce Hoffman with the installation of a statue of Joyce Hoffman on her surfboard at Watermen's Plaza, Dana Point. It was the fifth of ten life-size cast bronze statues by William Limebrook of Dana Point and watersport athletes, surfers, filmmakers, artists, and entrepreneurs in Watermen's Plaza. In July, 2025, Hoffman's statue was joined by statues of her father and uncle, Walter and Philip "Flippy" Hoffman, also by William Limebrook, at Watermen's Plaza, Dana Point.
