= Bud Browne =

American surf filmmaker (1912–2008)

Bud Browne (July 12, 1912 – July 25, 2008) was an American early pioneer surf film maker. He was the first filmmaker to show surf movies commercially.

Browne was captain of the swim team at the University of Southern California in 1933. He learned to surf during his time in Venice, California. He began filming surfing in the 1940s while visiting Hawaii.

== Early life ==
Bud Browne was born in Newtonville, Massachusetts on July 14, 1912 and died in San Luis Obispo, California on July 25, 2008. He moved to Los Angeles in 1931 and attended the University of Southern California, competing in collegiate swimming and became the captain of the team. In 1938, after graduating from the University, Browne obtained a job as a life guard. His time in this new occupation however, was short lived because he was soon enlisted into the Navy during World War II. While at war, he taught many Marines how to swim. After the war, he again received a job as a lifeguard and was given the nickname "Barracuda" because of his reputation as being one of the best body surfers of his time. While serving as a lifeguard in the late 1940s, Browne began filming body surfers. Realizing his potential, Browne went back to the University of South Carolina in the early 1950s to attend film school. While on a surfing expedition with Duke Kahanamoku in Waikiki, Hawaii in 1953, he made his inaugural film, Hawaiian Surfing Movies. The debut of his first film took place at John Adams Junior High School in Santa Monica, California to an audience of about 500 people. Because it was a silent film, Bud narrated the entirety of the film using the school's PA system.

== Career ==
Over the next 11 years, Bud Browne would produce a movie each year, which all abided by the same basic structure: a montage of surfing action in either California or Hawaii followed by a few on the road moments between excursions. The entire process of Browne's film making protocol was relatively cheap, costing around five thousand dollars to film, edit, and produce. Bud Browne, along with filming all of the footage, also functioned as a one-man production and editing crew. After piecing many shots together to create a fluid film he would promote his films by driving to the coast of California and setting up tents where he would show his films for little cost. As Browne started to gain publicity and profit in the early 1960s, he was able to hire DJs to ship his films to the east coast of the United States and even further out, to parts of Europe and Australia. Browne's strong swimming skills provided useful in being able to steadily shoot while in the water. As much as his shots were taken in the water, Browne developed his own waterproof camera and waterproof wetsuit. These innovations allowed Browne to stay in the water and film for hours at a time. Among Browne's accomplishments is the pipeline shot that views a wave as it is crashing over top of the surfer, creating a water tunnel. Browne was the first of many film makers that followed in similar fashions such as Bruce Brown, Jon Severson and Greg Noll. Although Bud Browne never made much money off of the films that he created, it caused no hindrance on his projects: "It was always worthwhile for me because I got such a big hoot out of everyone enjoying the films".

== Films ==
- Hawaiian Surfing Movie (1953)
- Hawaiian Surf Movie (1955)
- Trek to Makaha (1956)
- The Big Surf (1957)
- Surf Down Under (1958)
- Cat on a Hot Foam Board (1959)
- Surf Happy (1960)
- Spinning Boards (1961)
- Cavalcade of Surf (1962)
- Gun Ho! (1963)
- Locked In! (1964)
- You'll Dance in Tahiti (1967)
- Going Surfin' (1973)
