= Surfboard shaper =

Someone who builds and designs surfboards

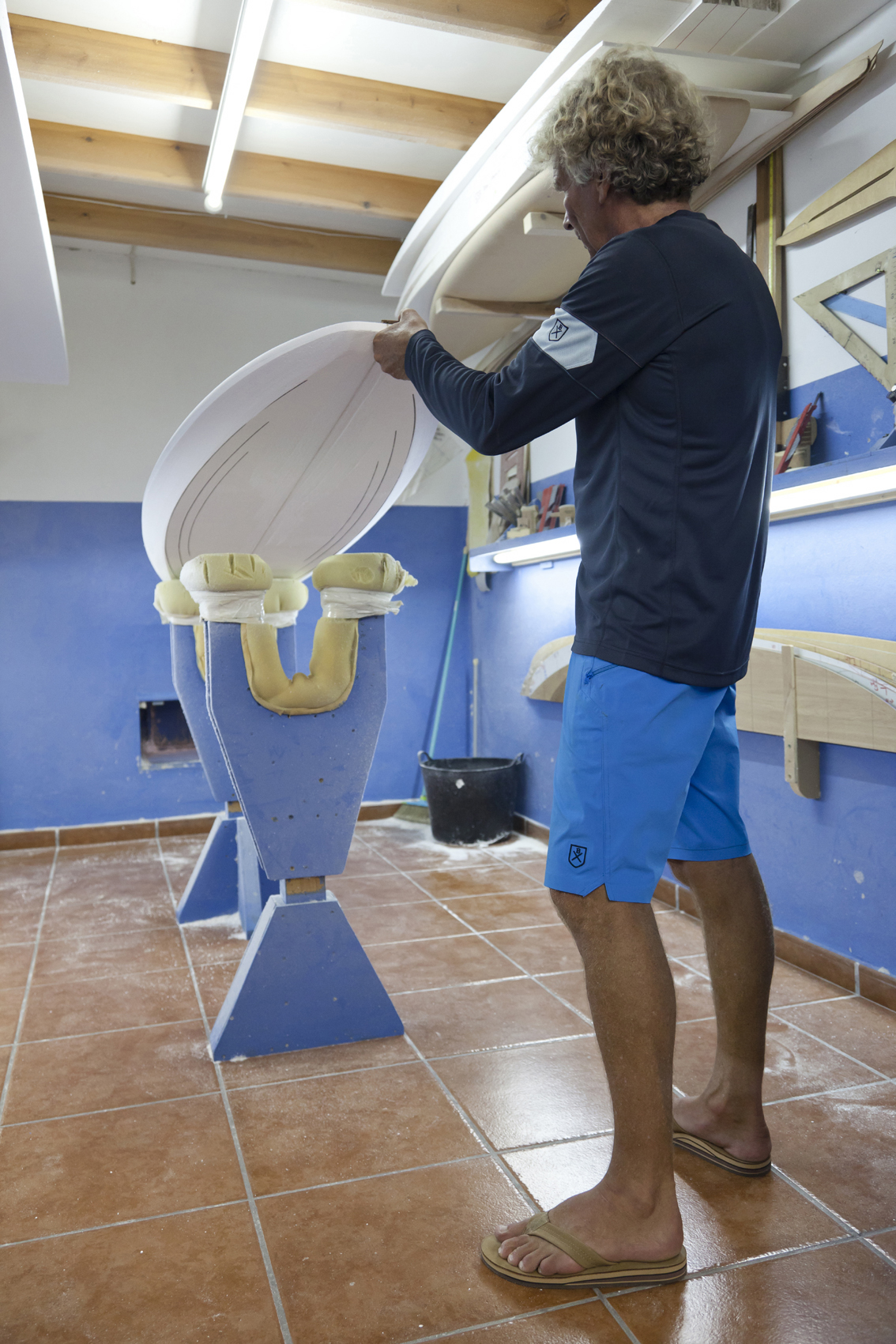
Shaper in his workshop

A surfboard shaper is someone who designs and builds surfboards. The process of surfboard shaping has evolved over the years, and the shaper often tailors his or her work to meet the requirements of a client or a certain wave. Surfboard shapers can be independent or work in collaboration with mass-production companies.

While originally made from wood, most modern surfboards are now constructed from pre-formed polyurethane or Styrofoam EPS blanks. The surfboard is then shaped using an array of tools, including but not limited to the following: surforms, rasps, grinders, sanders, and planes. After the form of the surfboard is sculpted from the blank, the shaper can lay fiberglass or carbon fiber sheets over the top and bottom of the surfboard, and laminate each sheet with a thermosetting substance, such as epoxy or polyester resin.

== History ==
=== Ancient Hawaiian surfboards ===
There exists very little evidence that pinpoints the exact location of the first surfboard shaper; however, historical analysis suggests that surfboarding itself first originated in Hawaii. The Hawaiian islanders most likely utilized only three species of tree as the base for their surfboards: the wiliwili (Erythrina monosperma), ulu (Artocarpus incisa), and koa (Acacia koa). After the chosen tree was cut, Hawaiian shapers used sea coral and oahi stones for light reduction; subsequently, the root of the ti plant and the bark of the kukui plant were used for the final burnish of the surfboard. Surfboard shaping was regarded by the Hawaiian islanders as a ceremonial rite; Hawaiian islanders often offered fish to surfriding trees as offerings.

Three foundational templates for surfboard shaping were utilized by the Hawaiian islanders: the alaia, the paipo, and the olo. The type of surfboard shape was actually indicative of Hawaiian social structure; the alaia and paipo boards were used by the commoners, while the olo boards were reserved for the royal class. However, the primary distinction between each ancient Hawaiian surfboard shape is their length and weight; paipo boards ranged from 3–6 feet long, alaia boards ranged from 7 to 12 feet long, and olo boards measured up to 20 feet long.

=== The "hollow board" era ===
The next technological change in the surfboard shaping industry came with the introduction of the “Hollow Board” by Hawaiian resident Tom Blake. In 1926, Blake acquired an ancient olo surfboard from Honolulu's Bishop Museum; the board was originally 16 feet long and weighed 150 pounds. In an effort to replicate the structure of the olo board, Blake drilled holes in a redwood blank and sealed the top of with wood with sheets of veneer, effectively creating the first “hollow” surfboard. Blake's innovative design drastically reduced the weight of the surfboard, and by 1930, the “Hollow Board” became the first mass-produced surfboard in the world.

=== The "balsa era" and the hot curl board ===
The advent of the 1930s marks the next technological revolutions in the history of the surfboard shaper. Balsa wood began to emerge as the most versatile base for the modernizing shaper; the balsa wood drastically reduced the weight of the surfboard, and allowed for surfers to move in the water with more speed and agility.

The addition of balsa wood subsequently led to the surfboard shaper's move towards the “Hot Curl Design.” By shaving off parts of the tail and shaping the sides of the board, surfboard shapers were able to produce surfboards that allowed surfers to pull into the “curl” of a wave.

=== Modern construction ===
The beginning of the 1940s marked the introduction of fiberglass resin, which allowed shapers to construct surfboards that were strong, light, and waterproof. Furthermore, surfboard shapers began to utilize alternate base materials, including both plastic and polyurethane foam. The addition of the new materials as well as fiberglass gave surfboard shapers more freedom and allowed them to incorporate both fins and rocker design in the construction of surfboards.

In the 1960s, the design of surfboard began to significantly shrink in size. In the era known as the "Shortboard Revolution", surfboard shapers, most notably George Greenough, Bob McTavish, and Simon Anderson reduced the length of the surfboard, creating a higher level of maneuverability. This innovation serves as the foundation for contemporary performance surfing.

== Surfboard shaping today ==
Currently, many surfboard shapers design surfboards using computer programs and hot-wire cutting machines that expedite the design process, especially in relation to mass-production. These computer programs allow the shaper to create an exacting and reproducible design that can be easily fine-tuned and adjusted.

Many professional shapers outsource the highly specialized task of lamination to “glassers”; “glassers” laminate fiberglass to the foam core of the surfboard using thermosetting resins, such as polyester or epoxy. Fins and assorted plugs are usually after lamination, and the final product is sanded and glossed down with buffing compounds and glossing resins.

The surfboard shaper often designs their surfboards based on the specifications of their client; the shaper will adjust the dimensions and concave of the board to tailor to different styles of surfing and various types of waves.

== How surfboards are shaped ==
Surfboard shaping is not done so easily; it takes patience and determination to properly craft a surfboard. Starting from the room where it's crafted and finishing with its glassing process. Surfboard shapers use a shaping room to begin their craft. Usually the rooms are at least 5 m × 2 m (16 ft × 8 ft) and consist of fluorescent lights. The standings where the blanks are shaped are nailed to the floor with lighting aligned near them. Lighting is a crucial part of the crafting process to make sure the board is perfectly constructed with the right dimensions. There are four key steps in building and shaping a surfboard: Shaping the template, preparing the fin setup and rails, rounding rails, and smoothing the outline.

=== Shaping the template ===
Start by adjusting the template paper over the blank, then cut the blank with a handsaw on both sides. Sand the rails until the edges are square. Then measure the size and thickness of the blank this will give you the measurements of foam needed. Remove the extra foam by passing it perpendicular to the stringer from tail to nose. Then repeat the process on the opposite side. Shape the tail and rocker by passing the planer over the areas.

=== Preparing the fin setup and rails ===
Mark the front fins positions on both sides then mark the back fins. Carefully remove all mistakes on the blank with sandpaper. Finally, cut the rail bevel from nose to fins to give a rounded-edge shape to the board.

=== Rounding rails ===
Start by turning the rails with the planer (nose to tail), then create a 45-degree angle from turning point on the deck to the top. Make sure the symmetry is correct on the other rail. Then with a sanding block round the rails to reduce sharp edges.

=== Smoothing the outline ===
Sand the deck until it blends with the rails. Then round and smooth the rails on both side. Then confirm the overall symmetry of the board. Measure and take note of the dimensions of the board. Finally, sign the surfboard and send it off to glassing.

== Notable shapers ==
=== Hobart "Hobie" Alter ===
Hobart Alter, also known as “Hobie", was a prominent surfboard shaper from Dana Point, California who is famously known for his experimentation with polyurethane foam as a base material for surfboards. In 1950, Hobie first began shaping balsa-wood surfboards in his family's Laguna Beach garage; however, it wasn't until a few years later that he opened the first Southern California surf shop in Dana Point. Hobie was a pioneer in 20th century surfboard construction and design; his most famous legacy lies in his creation of the polyurethane foam surfboard in 1958. The Hobie company continues to manufacture surfboards today.

=== Jeff Ho ===
Jeff Ho had a formative impact on surfboard shaping design and style in mid-20th century California. Ho shaped his first surfboard at the age of 14, and he soon began repairing and re-designing old boards found on the coast. In 1966, Ho began working as an apprentice to Bob Milner at Robert's Surfboards in Playa del Ray, California. It was here that Ho developed both the skillset to design high-performance surfboards; Ho's innovation led to the creation of the swallowtail board, which would later become a signifier of his shaping. In 1972, Ho purchased the a surf shop on the corner of Main and Bay Streets in Venice, California; he rebranded the shop as "Jeff Ho Surfboards and Zephyr Productions." While the Zephyr shop has been closed since 1976, Jeff Ho continues to shape surfboards as a personal Hobby to this day.

=== Donald Takayama ===
Donald Takayama was a professional surfer and acclaimed shaper from Hawaii. He began shaping surfboards out of wooden railway ties as a young boy; however, in 1957, he moved to California to apprentice under the legendary shaper Dale Velzy. Takayama eventually began to shape for Jacobs' Surfboards; his visually-clean longboard design became one of the most popular surfboard models in the mid 20th century. Takayama's knowledge and skill in regards to surfboard design have defined him as one of the most influential surfboard shapers of all time.

=== Simon Anderson ===
Simon Anderson is a surfer and shaper from Sydney, Australia who is most known for his innovation of the "thruster" board. In 1980, after viewing the work of shaper Frank Williams, Anderson constructed a surfboard with a square tail and three identical fins. Anderson's innovation, colloquially known as the "thruster", produced surfboards with enhanced stability and improved maneuverability. Anderson's "thruster" design is still utilized in the contemporary shaping world.

=== Other notable shapers ===
- Robert August
- Richard (Dick) Brewer
- Mike Diffenderfer
- Gerry Lopez
- Mickey Munoz
- Dale Velzy
- John Whitmore
- Jimmy Lewis
- George Greenough
- Bob McTavish
- Mark Richards
