= Skip Frye =

American surfer

Harry "Skip" Frye
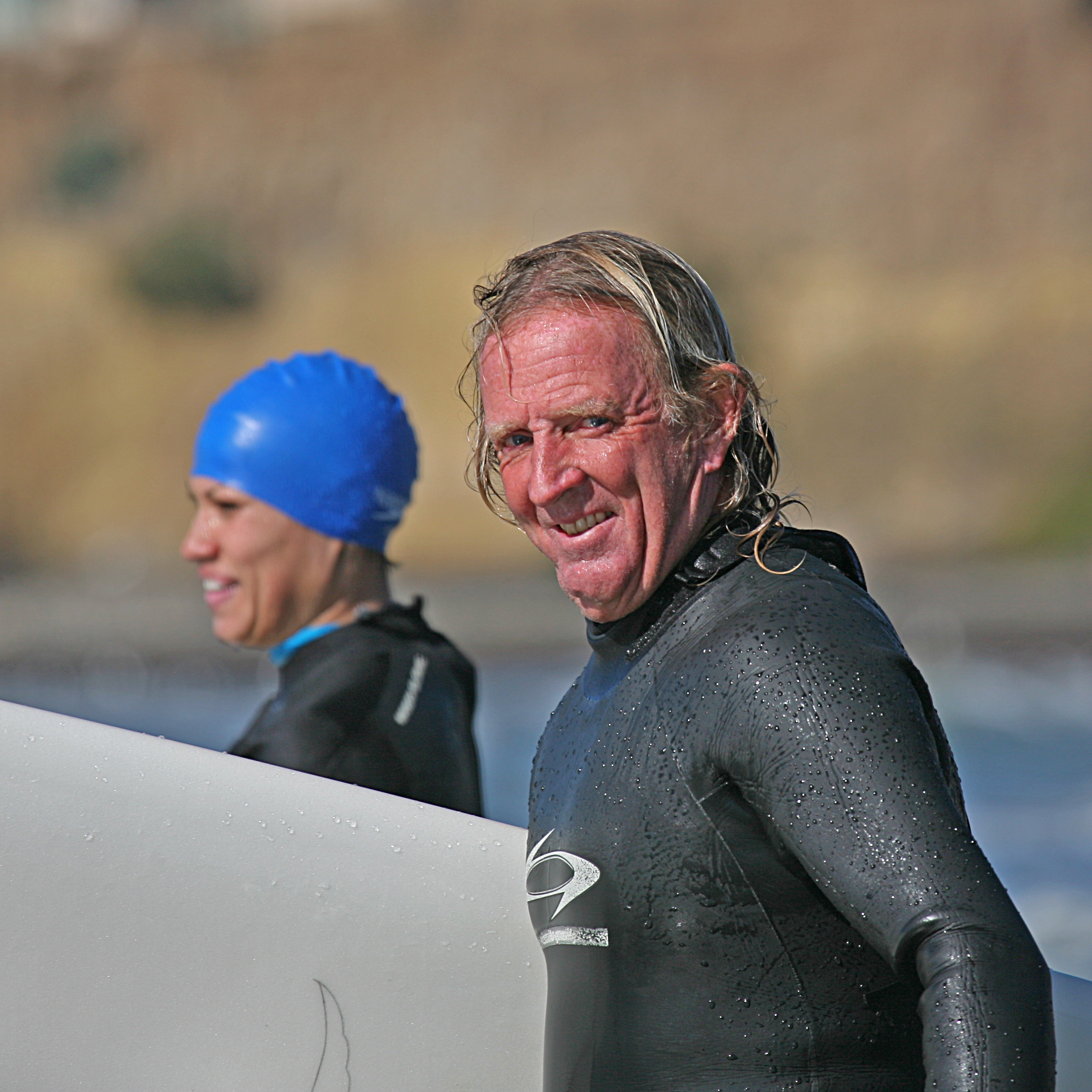
- Skip Frye in 2007

Personal information
- Born: Harry Richard Frye; September 7, 1941 (age 84) San Diego, California, U.S.
- Years active: 1958-present

Surfing career
- Sport: Surfing
- Best year: 1968
- Major achievements: 1963 Aquarium win, 1968 U.S. Invitational

Surfing specifications
- Stance: Regular (natural foot)
- Quiver: Eagles, Fish, Eggs
- Favorite waves: The Ranch, Rincon
- Favorite maneuvers: Being "In Trim"

Skip Frye (born Harry Richard Frye; September 7, 1941, in San Diego, California) is an American surfer, surfboard designer and shaper, and environmental activist.

== Career ==
Frye began surfing competitively in San Diego, in the late 1950s. His first surfboard was a balsa board shaped by Mike Diffenderfer. Riding for Gordon & Smith (G&S), Frye became one of the company's leading team riders and, in 1967, introduced his own signature model. He won national surfing titles and represented the United States in international competition in 1966. During his competitive career he appeared on the covers of numerous surfing publications, as well as the 1969 Sports Illustrated Swimsuit Issue alongside model Jamee Becker, The Surfer's Journal, Surfing, and Surfer Magazine.

Following a surfing trip to Australia in 1969, Frye began refining the surfboard designs for which he became best known, including his distinctive Egg, Fish, and longboard shapes. His boards are recognized for their refined outlines, foiled rails and fins, and emphasis on smooth, flowing surfing rather than high-performance maneuvering. His influence on modern surfboard design has made his handcrafted boards among the most highly sought after by surfers and collectors.

He is perhaps, best recognized by his iconic logo, a set of wings commonly referred to as "Frye Wings."

During the 1970s, Frye continued shaping boards independently from a small workspace behind Select Surf Shop in Pacific Beach. Because custom laminates were expensive, he often signed his distinctive wing logo directly onto boards in pencil—a period collectors later nicknamed his "ghetto days."

Images of him surfing with his dog, Leroy, silhouetted against a setting sun, and paddling alone into "The Ranch" have appeared in books and magazines and have been printed on clothing and surfboards.

== Legacy ==
Frye was inducted into the Surfboard Shapers Hall of Fame in 2006, the Huntington Beach Surfing Walk of Fame in 2011, the Skateboarding Hall of Fame in 2016 for his early contributions to downhill and slalom skateboarding, received the San Diego Surf Film Festival Lifetime Achievement Award in 2017, and was inducted into the San Diego Surfing Hall of Fame in 2019.

Although Frye largely stepped away from commercial surfboard production, he continues to hand-shape a limited number of boards each year. Because of their craftsmanship, performance, and scarcity, original Frye surfboards have become among the most sought-after custom boards in surfing and often command premium prices on the secondary market.

== Personal ==
Frye married Marcia Metcalf in 1963, and they raised three children. The couple divorced in 1982.

Frye married Donna Frye (née Sarvis) in 1990. Alongside Frye’s longtime friend, surfboard shaper Harry “Hank” Warner, the couple opened Harry’s Surf Shop in Pacific Beach. The shop housed both Skip Frye Surfboards and Hank Warner Custom Shapes, with Frye and Warner shaping boards on the premises. Frye has long been active in efforts to improve coastal water quality alongside his wife. Donna Frye later founded Surfers Tired of Pollution in 1995 and served on the San Diego City Council from 2001 to 2010.
