= Dale Velzy =

American surfboard shaper

- Born: September 23, 1927; Oakland, California
- Died: May 26, 2005 (aged 77); Mission Viejo, California
- Occupation: Surfboard shaper

Dale Velzy (September 23, 1927 – May 26, 2005) was an American surfboard shaper, credited with being the world's first commercial shaper. He opened the first professional surf shop in Manhattan Beach, California, in 1950, personally hand fashioning the surfboards from wood or synthetic material. By 1960, Velzy owned five retail shops and three production facilities in California and Hawaii. He was known as "Hawk" for his keen eyesight.

== Early life ==
Velzy was born on September 23, 1927, in Oakland, California. He had Dutch ancestry and his family was involved in wood-working, cabinetmaking or logging. His father was a woodworker and part-time life guard. Velzy began surfing as a boy and he and his father shaped boards with his grandfathers' woodworking tools. He quit school in the seventh grade. His parents tried sending him to military school, but he ran away. When he was 16 he enlisted in the Merchant Marine Corp. His tour through the Hawaiian Islands exposed him to the surf culture of the region. He then took what he learned with him and applied it to his own techniques.

== Career ==
After serving in World War II, Velzy returned to southern California and began his career as a surfboard shaper in Manhattan Beach in the mid-1940s. It was during this period that Velzy began his research on surfboard shaping. At that time most surfboards were extremely heavy, hard to transport and not as functional as modern surfboards. Most riders used hand-me-down boards, but Velzy and his associates had the benefit of being able to shape a board from scratch or re-shape an existing board, allowing them to improve their design through trial and error. During the late 1940s shapers began using balsa wood and fiberglass for making the surfboards lighter.

Velzy soon became known locally for constructing and repairing boards. His operation was initially based under the Manhattan Beach Pier, but by 1949 he had outgrown it. He borrowed money to rent a former shoe repair store nearby, setting up what is usually regarded as the first commercial surf shop. He marked his boards with a small sticker reading "Designed by Velzy". The success of the shop allowed Velzy to hone his craft and experiment with new designs. Velzy's early commercial designs were cut down from full pieces of balsa, rather than blanks, and sealed with fiberglass and resin by glasser Bev Morgan. In 1953, Velzy partnered with Hap Jacobs to open a new and larger shop in Venice, California. Together they created the narrow-nosed "pig" design, which revolutionized the sport by allowing for more dramatic turns and cut-backs. Around this time, polyurethane replaced balsa as the industry standard, making boards much lighter, below 50 pounds (23 kg). As the industry boomed, Jacobs went out on his own in 1959, and Velzy expanded his business to several retail shops and production facilities throughout southern California.

By 1960, Velzy had bought out his business partner. During this period he conceptualized promotional techniques that are standard in the modern surfing industry. These techniques include corporate sponsorship of competitive surfers and documentary films on the budding sport.

He had Velzyland, a surf spot/break in Hawaii, named after him in the 50s and is still called that today.

== Death ==
After suffering from lung cancer, Velzy died on May 26, 2005. The Dale Velzy Memorial was held at Doheny State Beach on June 14, 2005, with more than 3000 surfers going into the water in his honor.
