= Noosa Festival of Surfing =

Australian surfing competition

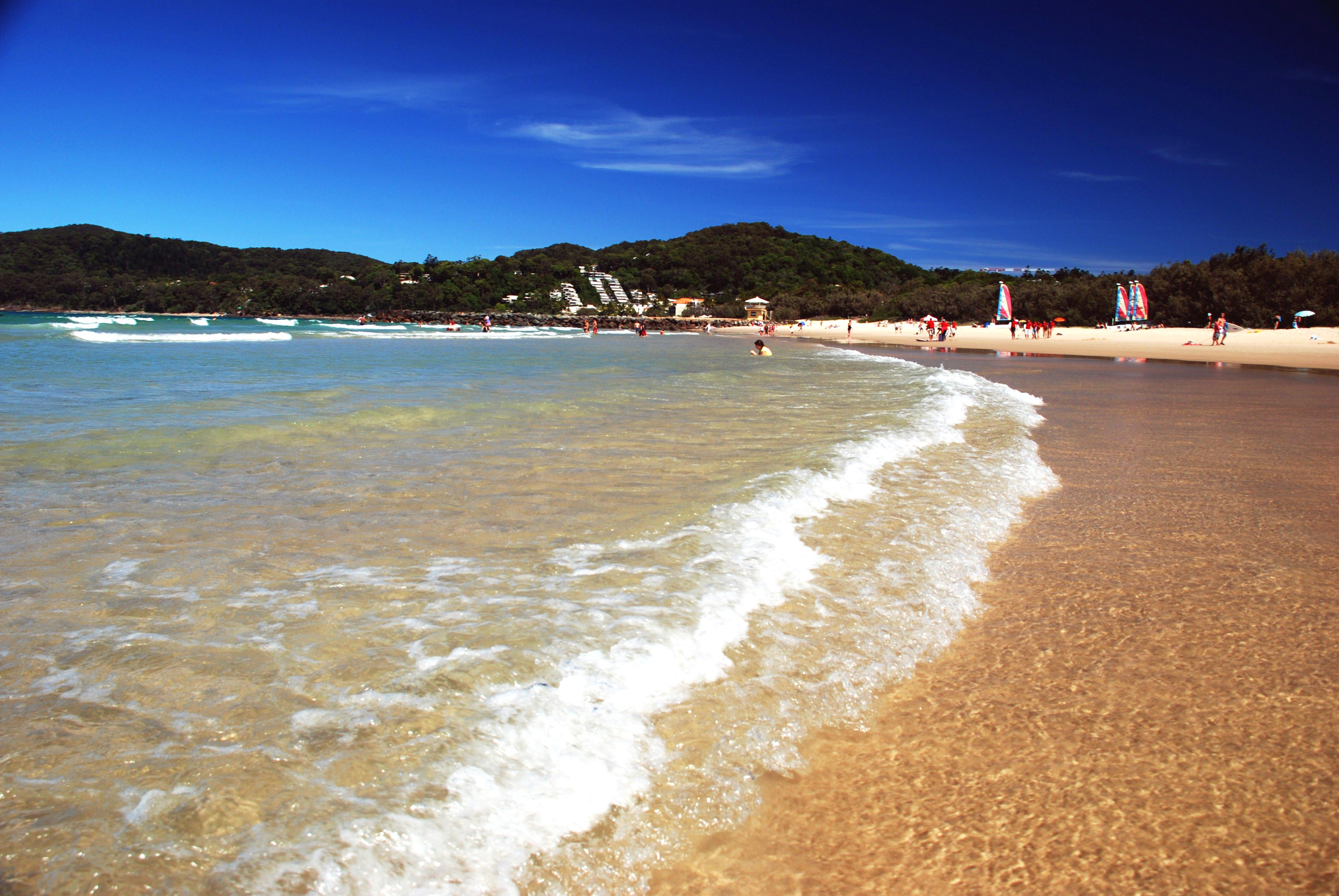
Noosa beach, 2008

The Noosa Festival of Surfing was established in 1992 at Noosa, Queensland by members of the Noosa Malibu Club, as an amateur surfing competition called the Noosa Malibu Classic. It allowed club members to invite friends to surf Noosa's right-hand point breaks and the event's popularity among competitive longboarders gave the club a chance to take the event to a higher level.

In 1996 a professional division was introduced and prompted the name change to The Noosa Festival of Surfing (NFOS) in 1998. The World Tandem Surfing Championships (for tandem surfers) were brought to Noosa in 1999 and Stand up paddle surfing was incorporated into the Festival in 2007 with live entertainment and fundraising auctions also being held. In 2008, the Festival, sponsored by Global Surf Industries and maintained and managed by USM Events, commenced with the traditional Mixing of the Waters ceremony led by Hawaiian waterman Brian Keaulana. The Noosa Festival of Surfing is an official Association of Surfing Professionals (ASP) Longboard rated event.

== Background ==
Noosa was the heart of Australian surfing in the late 50s and early 60s, with some noteworthy innovations in surfboard design. Most importantly, the shorter boards they were riding at the time. In the early sixties, Kevin Platt designed the early shorter transitional boards under influence from George Greenough. He was working at the time for Hewston Surfboards. A later and shorter advancement of these designs can be seen ridden in the Paul Witzig 1967 film "The Hot Generation". Trevor Hewston was the first board builder in Noosa from around 1958. Trevor is still innovating today with advancements in epoxy technology.

The points at Noosa are known for producing long, peeling waves, including occasional barrel sections. Historically, the area was less developed, with lower visitor numbers and camping available near the end of Hastings Street. In recent decades, increased tourism, urban development, and population growth have contributed to higher levels of crowding in and around the surf breaks.

Since 2012, the Festival has also included the Noosa Surfing Dog Championship, Australia’s oldest and biggest dog surfing event.

In 2018, management of the Festival was taken over by interests associated with John Finlay and Josh Allen.

== Log Pro Final results ==
Year	Men's Logger	Women's Logger	Old Mal (Noserider till 2018)	Women's Open	Men's Open
2026	Declan Wyton	Sophia Culhane	Matt Chojnacki	Alana Johnson	Declan Wyton
2025	Kai Ellice-Flint	Tully White	Dylan Macleod	Emma Perrier	Nic Jones
2024	Jack Tyro	Hiroka Yoshikawa	Jack Tyro	Alana Johnson	Ben Williams
2023	Augusto Olinto	Hiroka Yoshikawa	Lawrence Harkness	Sierra Lerback	Dane Pioli
2022	Matt Cuddihy	Mason Schremmer	Sierra Lerback	Bea Conroy	Nic Brewer
2021	Matt Chojnacki	Tully White	Matt Chojnacki	Tully White	Ben Considine
2020	Matt Chojnacki	Honolua Blomfield	Not held	Hayley Otto	Kaniela Stewart
2019	Kaniela Stewart	Sierra Lerback	Not held	Avalon Gall	Kai Sallas
2018	Zye Norris	Honolua Blomfield	Dane Pioli	Soleil Errico	Nic Jones
2017	Bowie Pollard	Hiroki Yoshikawa	Clinton Guest	Hiroki Yoshikawa	Kai Takayama
2016	Matt Chojnacki	Honolua Blomfield	Taylor Jensen	Karina Rozunko	Nic Jones
2015	Sam Crookshanks (plus Duct Tape Invitational)	Karina Rozunko	Harley Ingleby	Mele Saili	Joe Rickabough
2014	Harrison Roach	Honolua Blomfield	Taylor Jensen	Kathryn Hughes	Taylor Jensen
2013	Harrison Roach^{(plus Duct Tape Invitational)}	Isabelle Braly	Harrison Roach		Nic Jones
2012	Harrison Roach	Chelsea Williams	Zye Norris		Nic Jones
2011	Josh Constable	Chelsea Williams	Harrison Roach	Erin Dark	Jordi Brown
2010	Taylor Jensen	Crystal Dzigas	Christian Wach	Sharon Jackson	George Cunningham
2009	Taylor Jensen	Chelsea Williams	Christian Wach	Monique Keane	Justin Healy
2008	Josh Constable	Jennifer Smith	Christian Wach	Monique Keane	Ben Howarth
2007	Josh Constable	Chelsea Williams	Christian Wach		
2006	Grant Thomas	Belinda Baggs	Matt Cuddihy		
2005	Grant Thomas	Joy Magelssen Monahan	Matt Cuddihy		
2004					
2003	Dave Simons				
2002	Josh Constable				
2001	Ian Bell	Jenny McCarthy	kevin Connolly		
1999-2000	Joel Tudor (2 in a row)				
1996-98	Bonga Perkins (3 in a row)				

== See also ==
- Noosa Surfing Dog Championship
- List of festivals in Australia
