= Beau Young =

Australian surfer, singer and songwriter (born 1974)

Personal information
- Born: 28 August 1974 (age 51) Grafton, New South Wales, Australia
- Years active: 1992 - 2004
- Website: beauyounghandshaped.com

Surfing career
- Sport: Surfing
- Best year: Ranked 1st - 2000 and 2003, ASP World Tour Ranking
- Sponsors: Bear Surfboards
- Major achievements: 2 times ASP World Longboard Champion

Surfing specifications
- Shaper: Bear Surfboards

Beau Young is an Australian surfer, singer and songwriter.

== Early life ==
Beau was born 28 August 1974 in Grafton, New South Wales, the second youngest of four children of the 1960s and 1970s surfer Nat Young.

== Surfing career ==
Following in his father's footsteps, his success as a professional surfer earned him the highest status in being crowned the ASP World Longboard Champion in 2000 and again in 2003, defeating Joel Tudor on both occasions in the final. In 1998, he finished second in the ASP World Tour. He then retired from competition and pursued a successful music career. His brother, Bryce Young, is also a professional longboarder and his sisters Nava and Naomi are also notable surfers.

== Music career ==
In 2005, Young released his first album, Waves of Change, in Australia and Japan. The album debuted at #13 on the independent charts in Australia, reaching #10 in the following weeks. His second album, One Step at a Time, was released in 2008. He has toured Japan four times, Italy, France, the U.S. and Spain.

== Filmography ==
- Hang (2005) (video) .... Himself
- Singlefin: Yellow (2005) (video) .... Himself
- The Coconut Technique (2004) (video) .... Himself
- Cleo Bachelor 2002: Real Men Revealed (2002) (TV) .... Himself
- Costa Rica: Land of Waves (2001) (video) .... Himself
- The Endless Summer 2 (1994) .... Surfer
