= Ricochet (dog) =

American surfing dog (2008–2023)

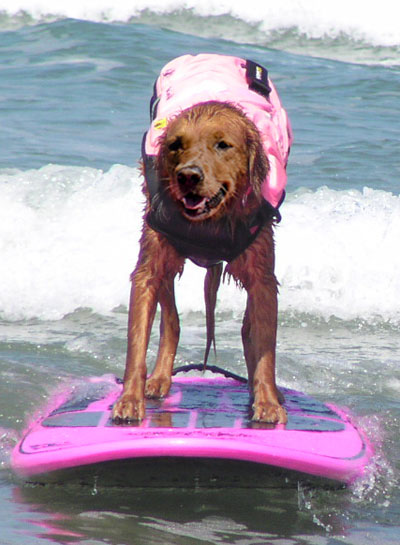
- Species: Canis lupus familiaris
- Breed: Golden Retriever
- Sex: Female
- Born: January 25, 2008; San Diego, California, U.S.
- Died: March 31, 2023 (aged 15)
- Employer: Puppy Prodigies
- Known for: Surfing, empathic & intuitive healing, raising awareness and funds
- Title: SURFice dog
- Owner: Judy Fridono

Ricochet (January 25, 2008 – March 31, 2023) was a female Golden Retriever dog from San Diego. She was one of the original surfing dogs that started the whole dog surfing circuit. She entered her first surf dog competition when she was 15 months old. She was a competitive surfing dog for several years and typically placed in one of the top three spots of competitions.

Ricochet helped people with disabilities through surfing and community outreach. Ricochet's popularity on social media originated from a video of her surfing with a boy who is quadriplegic that was posted on YouTube. As of May 22, 2016, the video has more than 12.5 million views on YouTube and Facebook.

When Ricochet was 8 weeks old, she climbed on a boogie board in a kiddie pool and was able to balance on her own. She has surfed ever since. She started entering surf dog contests in 2010. On June 10, 2011, she surfed with surf pro, Taylor Knox. On June 16, 2012, she surfed with actor, Cameron Mathison in the Loews Coronado Bay Resort surf dog contest and won 2nd place. In August 2012 Ricochet surfed with a goat named Pismo. On July 20, 2014, she surfed with surf pro Rob Machado.

Ricochet was also the canine ambassador for surfers with disabilities and referred to as a SURFice dog, because she surfed as an assertive aid with children with special needs, people with disabilities, and veterans who were wounded or who had PTSD.

== Early life ==
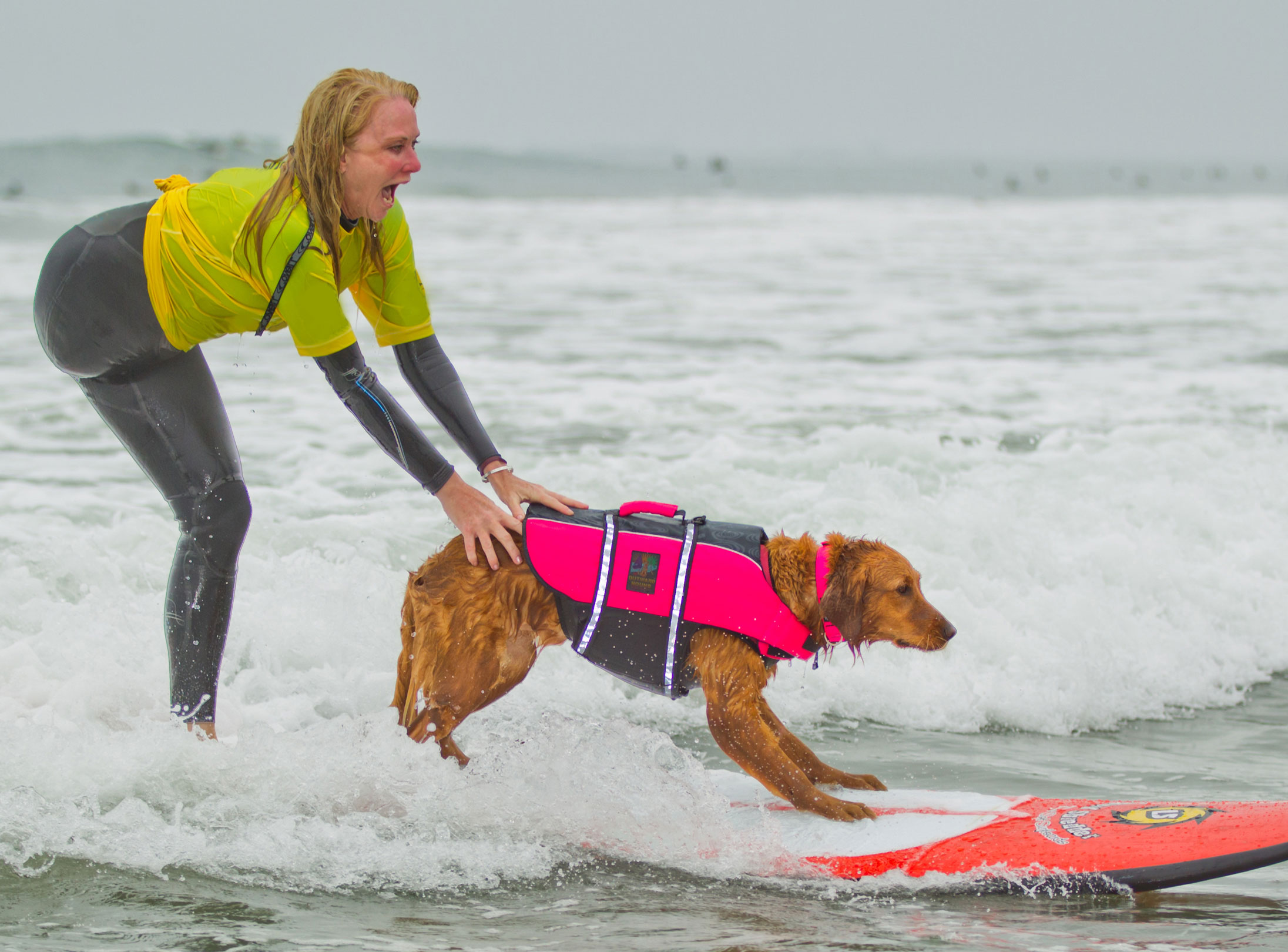
Ricochet in 2012

Ricochet was raised and trained by Judy Fridono as part of Fridono's non-profit 501(c)3 organization, Puppy Prodigies Neo-Natal & Early Learning Program. The organization trains dogs to be service dogs for people with disabilities. She started training to be a service dog but as she grew, her instinct for chasing birds and other wildlife increased and she was dropped from the program. On August 20, 2009, she jumped on a surfboard with a 14-year-old boy named Patrick Ivison who is quadriplegic.

Ricochet was 15 months old when she started her competitive dog surfing career at the Purina Incredible Dog Challenge Surf Dog competition, where she won third place. Ricochet went on to win additional Purina Surf Dog contests as well as contests held by the Helen Woodward Animal Center's Surf Dog Surf-a-thon, Loews Coronado Bay Resort Surf Dog Contests (now known as Unleashed By Petco's Surf Dog Contests) and Surf City Surf Dog surf contests.

== Canine research ==
Ricochet was involved in dog-human communication research with Dr. Brian Hare at the Duke University Canine Cognition Center. In May 2015, Ricochet appeared in Nat Geo Wild's "Is Your Dog A Genius" hosted by Dr. Hare. In this show, Dr. Hare explained canine cognition and how Ricochet uses empathy (the ability to understand and share the feelings of others) while identifying, responding and communicating with veterans who have PTSD.

== Community outreach ==
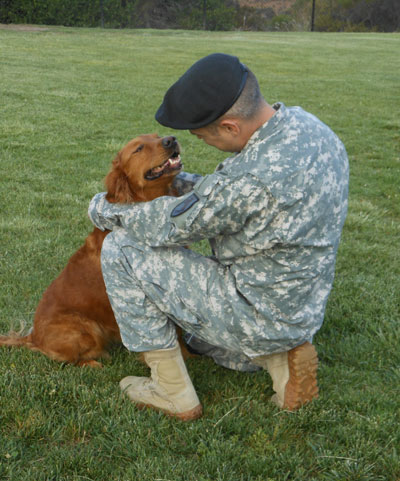
Ricochet with a United States Army Sergeant in 2013

After Ricochet's video went viral she turned the attention into a platform for raising awareness and funds for human and animal causes. She has appeared at many community events in the San Diego area. She has served as the Grand Marshal at the Navy Woof Walk in 2014 and 2015.

Ricochet was an ambassador for Pay It Forward Day, The Best Day Foundation, Life Rolls On and Team PossAbilities para-Olympic team. She has held more than 150 fundraisers and donated funds to more than 250 different causes.

Ricochet performed therapy dog work with active duty military service members who had PTSD, traumatic brain injuries and other disabilities as a result of combat. She participated in a PTSD Battle Buddy program with retired Staff Sergeant Randy Dexter. She was also active with the Jimmy Miller Memorial Foundation's Ocean Therapy program, wounded warriors, and challenged athletes foundation. Ricochet had the ability to identify and alert to the emotional and physical changes of the individuals she interacted with. This ability allowed for remarkable healing interventions.

Ricochet was featured on ABC for her ability to take commands from a synthesized voice on an iPad from children with autism.

Ricochet was also a registered therapy dog with Therapy Dogs Incorporated, a certified therapy dog with Paws’itive Teams and has the highest therapy dog title with the AKC. As of April 24, 2015, she has raised over $457,000.

== Death ==
Ricochet was diagnosed with liver cancer in August 2022. She died on March 31, 2023, at the age of 15.

== Merchandising ==
Health Communications Inc approached Fridono about writing a book about Ricochet. In June 2014, Ricochet: Riding a Wave of Hope With the Dog Who Inspires Millions was published. The book was released in paperback in May 2015, and a Japanese edition has also been published in Japan. Ricochet also appears in 13 other books, including A Year With National Geographic: Yearbook 2014, Animals and the Kids Who Love Them, The Power of Wagging Tails, A Book of Miracles, Devoted, Surf Dog Miracles, San Diego North Coast and Daisy to the Rescue.

Ricochet's branded merchandise includes calendars, T-shirts, a stuffed animal, stickers, "paw it forward" wristbands and trading cards.

== Media appearances ==
=== Print ===
Ricochet was featured in more than 40 magazine articles including People Magazine, Guideposts, Dog Fancy, Fido Friendly, Modern Dog, Cesar's Way, AKC Gazette, Woman's World, and many more. In addition to the articles, she has been on the cover of Pup Culture, San Diego Pets, K9 Reporter, American Dog, Scholastic, Woof and Animal Wellness.

=== Television ===
Ricochet appeared on the Oprah Winfrey Network, Nat Geo Wild, an MTV special called "Made" and was a Jeopardy question. She also appeared in two Bark Box commercials.

Ricochet was featured on Good Morning America, ABC Evening News With Diane Sawyer, ESPN, Associated Press, NBC, ABC, CBS, Fox News, Animal Planet.

Ricochet was profiled in Season 1, Episode 1 of Tails of Valor, a children's educational program presenting true stories of service animals and the work they do to change people's lives.

=== Film ===
Ricochet appeared as an extra in the movie Marmaduke. She was also cast as "Melvin" in the movie "The Magic Bracelet" that featured Bailey Madison, Jackson Rathbone, J.K. Simmons, Hailee Steinfeld, and James Van Der Beek.

Ricochet was in a documentary called "Going the Distance", produced by David L. Brown.

Ricochet was featured in an IMAX film produced by Daniel Ferguson about "super hero" dogs, released in 2017.

=== Notoriety ===
Ricochet's surfing was featured on the Jumbo Tron in Times Square three times. She was also on the Jumbo Tron on the Las Vegas strip.

Ricochet appeared on two billboards. Once with three other surf dogs. And another time with a goat.

Ricochet threw out the first pitch at a San Diego Padres game in August 2013.

Ricochet appeared in two music videos, "Seven wonders of the world" produced by the Make A Film Foundation and "San Diego Dogs" which is a parody of California Girls by Katy Perry produced by Surf's Up Studios.

== Recognition ==
Ricochet won many surf dog contests, fundraising and top dog awards. These are just a few:

Surf Dog Ricochet won the American Kennel Club's Award for Canine Excellence in 2010.

The ASPCA named Ricochet 2011's Dog of the Year.

Ricochet won the American Humane Association's Hero Dog Award in the emerging hero category at the 2011 Hero Dog Awards. She was escorted down the red carpet by Victoria Stillwell from Animal Planet's "It's Me or the Dog". Ricochet also rubbed paws with celebrities including Peter Fonda, Orlando Brown, Michelle Forbes, Jason Lewis, Anna Trubanskaya, Rin Tin Tin and Betty White.

== Bibliography ==
- Fridono, Judy and Pfaltz, Kay (June 3, 2014). Ricochet: Riding a Wave of Hope With the Dog Who Inspires Millions. Health Communications, Inc. ISBN 0-7573-1772-3
