= Sophie Goldschmidt =

British global business executive

Sophie Goldschmidt is a British global business executive who is currently the president and CEO of U.S. Ski & Snowboard, the national governing body for Olympic and Paralympic skiing and snowboarding in the United States. Prior to U.S. Ski & Snowboard, Goldschmidt was on the advisory board for the World Surf League (WSL), after stepping down from her position as chief executive officer in February 2020. Goldschmidt was included on the 2018 Forbes list of the "Most Powerful Women In International Sport," after overseeing various groundbreaking partnerships, including an exclusive digital broadcasting rights deal for the WSL with Facebook worth over $30 million over two years. Goldschmidt also currently advises various companies in the sport, media, technology, health and fitness sectors.

== Early life and education ==
Goldschmidt grew up in the UK and then received a tennis scholarship to attend Baylor University in Texas. After playing on their team for four years, she received a business degree at Baylor University. She made her pro tennis debut in 1991, playing doubles at the ITF Frinton tournament, however due to an injury she was forced to quit playing.

== Career ==
=== Adidas ===
While studying for her degree at Baylor University, Goldschmidt began an internship at Adidas, which quickly evolved into a full-time position in marketing tennis and soccer.

=== Women's Tennis Association ===
Goldschmidt has worked as vice president of marketing and sponsorship at the Women’s Tennis Association.

=== NBA ===
In 2007, Goldschmidt joined the National Basketball Association. She was soon promoted to senior vice president and managing director for Europe, Middle East and Africa. During her tenure, Goldschmidt was the driving force behind the league’s growth across media distribution, sponsorship, licensing and events in addition to overseeing various regional offices. While leading NBA’s international efforts, Goldschmidt helped bring the NBA's first-ever regular season games to Europe in 2011. Goldschmidt also oversaw a multi-year agreement between NBA and ESPN which provided close to 100 NBA games, original programming and classic content to UK and Irish sports fans each season on ESPN, ESPN America and ESPN Classic, in addition to several other new media deals.

=== Rugby Football Union ===
Goldschmidt was appointed by the Rugby Football Union (RFU) as its chief commercial and marketing officer in July 2011. She was also the board's first-ever female member, responsible for the union's key revenue areas, which achieved record levels under her leadership, as well as overseeing marketing, digital, CRM, resourcing, communications and project management. During almost five years at the RFU, Goldschmidt brokered various ground-breaking deals such as an extended four-year sponsorship renewal with telecommunications services provider O2, estimated to be worth £18 million to the governing body. She also brokered a three-year deal with the National Football League to host matches at Twickenham Stadium.

=== PGA ===
While at the RFU, Goldschmidt was appointed as non-executive director to board of the PGA European Tour, making history by becoming one of the first two women to sit on the board. The appointment highlighted the tour's aim to edge further towards a more commercial approach to business and strengthen policies of diversity and inclusion in the sport. She was also a non-executive director on the Youth Sport Trust board.

=== CSM ===
Following her tenure at the RFU, Goldschmidt joined UK-based global sports marketing agency CSM Sport & Entertainment in 2015, as group managing director.

=== World Surf League ===
Goldschmidt was appointed as CEO of the World Surf League in July 2017. At the time of her appointment, the WSL's lead investor, Dirk Ziff, described Goldschmidt as "exactly what the league needs," and that her "experience, strong leadership and winning and inclusive management style" would "further elevate the league and grow engagement among fans around the world." Despite a lack of practical surfing experience, Goldschmidt still succeeded in carving a new path for the sport.

In addition to launching a new strategy and direction for pro surfing, Goldschmidt successfully implemented the first-ever professional surf events in 2018, featuring an artificial wave system. The Founder's Cup was held at the WSL Surf Ranch and, for the first time in the sport's history, was aired live for four hours across the CBS broadcast network. In an interview with CBS Sport, Goldschmidt explained, "Our expanded national broadcast and live streaming platforms will help to showcase what our surf fans already know and love: surfing is an incredible sport that delivers excitement, athleticism, and engaging content."

2019 saw Goldschmidt make the WSL the first U.S-based global sports league to enforce pay equality at its events. Speaking on the WSL Equal Prize money commitment, Goldschmidt said, '"This is a huge step forward in our long-planned strategy to elevate women's surfing and we are thrilled to make this commitment as we reveal our new 2019 schedule." Goldschmidt continued to honour female surfers by launching a marketing campaign that highlighted the women's tour and focussed on increasing viewership and fan engagement.

Goldschmidt continued to reshape the WSL when she relaunched their ocean conservation efforts. Such commitments were designed to inspire, educate and empower those associated with the ocean and to address critical environmental issues.

In 2020, Goldschmidt led negotiations on the WSL's historic 10-year agreement with professional surfers' representative body, World Professional Surfers. Made ahead of the 2021 Olympic Games, it stands as the longest agreement ever made between the two groups. The agreement will come at a pivotal moment in the sport’s history, helping ensure stability and alignment in the years to come.

=== U.S. Ski & Snowboard ===
Goldschmidt was appointed president and CEO of U.S. Ski & Snowboard, the Olympic and Paralympic national governing body for skiing and snowboarding in the United States, in October 2021. She took over the positions from previous president and CEO Tiger Shaw. She is the organization's first female CEO.

== Achievements ==
Goldschmidt was ranked number 15 on the 2018 Forbes list of the "Most Powerful Women In International Sport" and included in Adweek’s “29 Marketing Innovators That Are Changing The Game For Fans and Brands”. Goldschmidt was also in Sport 360’s "100 Most Influential Women In Sport," and Marketing Week's Vision 100.

== Personal life ==
As of 2017, Goldschmidt lives in Santa Monica, California.
