= Phil Rajzman =

Brazilian surfer

- Born: Philip Wollens Rajzman; 27 June 1982 (age 42); Rio de Janeiro, Brazil

Phil Rajzman (born Philip Wollens Rajzman on 27 June 1982 in Rio de Janeiro) is a Brazilian professional surfer and two time World Surf League (WSL) world champion.

As a disciple of one of the pioneers in Brazilian surfing, Rico de Souza, Rajzman began catching waves at six years old and was recognized as a prodigy in Brazilian surfing. He has been consistently present on podiums since 1994, when he started competing.

At the age of 15 Rajzman became a known figure, with his great performances on giant waves in Hawaii. He was invited to join the first Brazilian Tow-In Team, where the surfer is pulled by a jet-ski, searching for the biggest and best waves possible.

In 2002, Rajzman participated in the documentary film Surf Adventures, including a sequence of his maneuvers at Fernando de Noronha. A sequel, Surf Adventures 2, was released in 2008, with Rajzman performing on both a short and longboard.

In May 2007, at the world finals in France, Rajzman won the (then-named) Association of Surfing Professionals World Longboard Tour Championship. He won his second WSL World Longboard Tour Championship in 2016, at a competition in China.

Rajzman is the son of professional volleyball player Bernard Rajzman and professional figure skater Michele Wollens.
