= Brian Keaulana =

Hawaiian surfer

- Born: Makaha, Hawaii, United States
- Occupations: Lifeguard, Actor, Professional stuntman, Stunt coordinator

Brian Keaulana is a well known Hawaiian surfer, lifeguard, and waterman. He played himself in Baywatch: Hawaii and has provided invaluable support as a stunt coordinator in dozens of major motion pictures. He has extensive experience for water stunts.

== Relatives ==
Son of the legendary Hawaiian 'Buffalo' Keaulana. Born and raised on the beach at Makaha. His brother, Rusty Keaulana was 3 time Asp World Longboard Champion.

== Filmography ==
=== Film ===
- Point Break 2015 stunt coordinator: Hawaii
- Jurassic World 2015 stunts
- Dawn of the Planet of the Apes 2014 stunts
- The Descendants 2011 stunt coordinator
- Forgetting Sarah Marshall 2008 stunts as Brian Keaulana
- Pipeline 2007 stunt coordinator
- Memoirs of a Geisha 2005 stunts
- The Big Bounce 2004 as Barry Salu
- 50 First Dates 2004 as Jet Skier
- In God's Hands 1995 as Brian
- Waterworld 1995 stunts
- Baywatch the Movie: Forbidden Paradise 1995 as Brian Keaulana
- The Endless Summer II 1994 as surfer

=== Television ===
- Hawaii Five-0 (TV) 2010 as Brian Keaulana (2 episodes 2010–1)
- Beyond the Break (TV) 2007 stunts/stunts performer (7 episodes 2006–7)
- Fear Factor (TV) 2005
- North Shore (TV) 2005 as stunt coordinator
- Baywatch: Hawaii (TV) 1999–2001 as himself
