= Dog surfing =

Surfing technique involving highly trained dogs

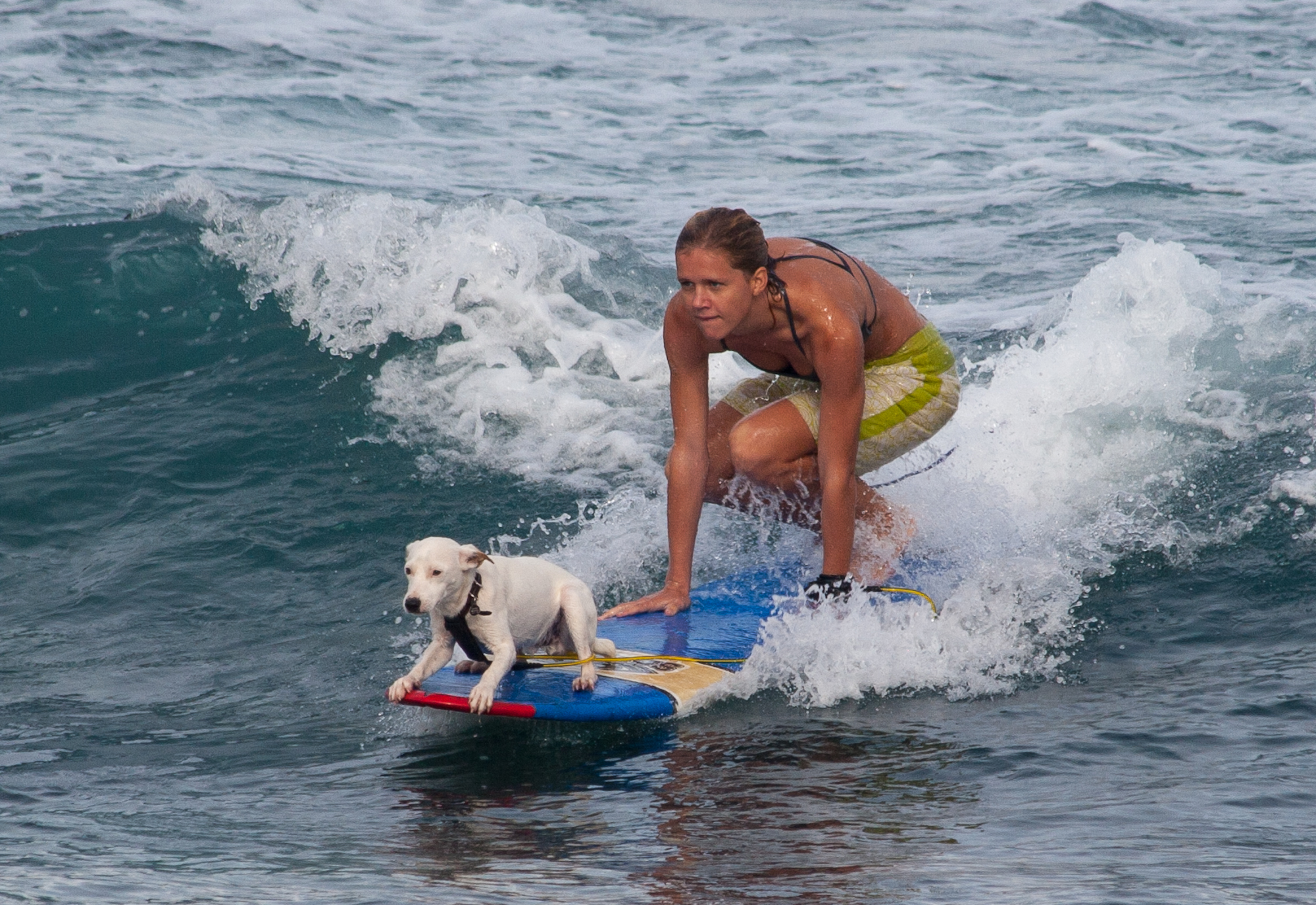
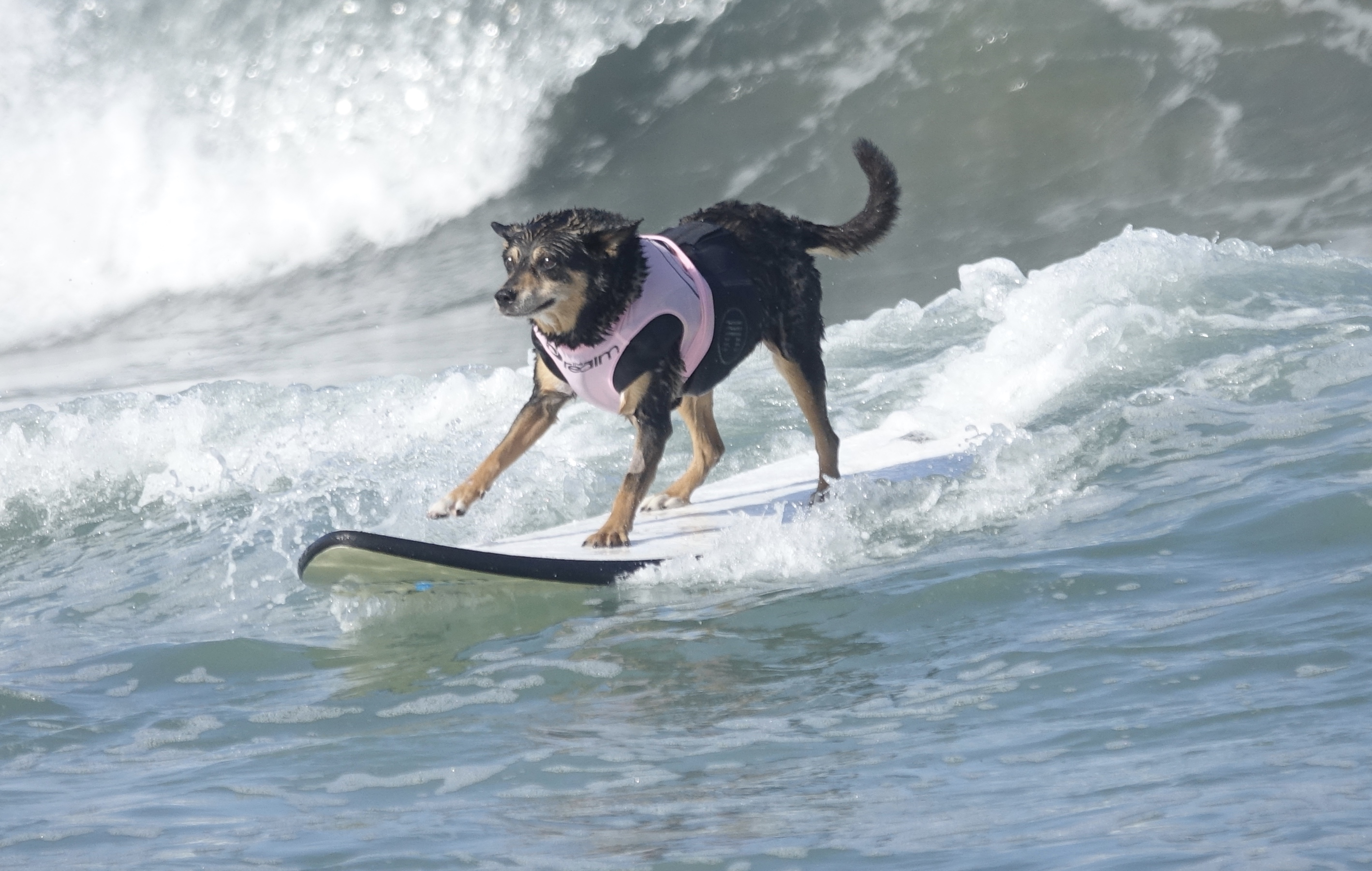
Dogs surfing both with and without a human partner

Dog surfing is a type of surfing maneuver involving dogs that are trained to surf on surfboards, bodyboards, skimboards, windsurf boards or to bodysurf. Historically, surfing dogs have been documented as occurring as early as the 1920s in the United States. Competitions and exhibitions that feature surfing dogs have occurred in various coastal areas of the United States, such as Del Mar, California, Imperial Beach, California, Pacifica, California and Jupiter, Florida.

== Overview ==
Dog surfing involves dogs that are trained to surf on surfboards or bodyboards, either alone or with a human on the board. Some dogs have been trained to ride a skimboard on the shore (after the board is initially skimmed by a human) and to windsurf with a human, and bodysurfing dogs have also been documented in surfing media.

== History ==
On the Waves at Waikiki, a 1930s short film that featured a surfing dog named Night Hawk

Dog surfing has been documented as occurring in the 1920s in California and Hawaii. In the 1930s, a short film titled On the Waves at Waikiki depicts Phillip K. Auna and Night Hawk, his terrier, surfing together on a wooden surfboard in Hawaii. The terrier was able to perform the hang ten surfing maneuver on the surfboard. In 1944, a full page image of a surfing dog named "Rusty" was published in National Geographic magazine. In the 1950s, UPI published a photograph of Joseph "Scooter Boy" Kaopuiki and his dog Sandy surfing in Hawaii, which was published in newspapers throughout the United States. During this time, they were also reported about on the television show You Asked For It!. Dave Chalmers and his surfing terrier mix named Max, both from San Diego, California, were featured in several forms of media in the late 1970s through the 1980s, including surf movies and a television appearance on the show Amazing Animals.

A Labrador Retriever named Cam was documented in Honolulu, Hawaii surfing partially lying down while simultaneously drinking from a bottle of beer.

== Competitions ==
In dog surfing competitions, judging criteria may include the dog's overall certainty on the board, wave size and ride length.

The Loews Coronado Bay Resort Surf Dog Competition at Imperial Beach in California has been described as the largest dog surfing competition in the United States. The first competition was held in 2006. In 2011, over fifty dogs participated, and the competition categorized entries by small dogs, large dogs and tandem dogs. Tandem surfing involves two or more dogs surfing together on one surfboard, or a dog surfing with a human. In June 2012, fifty dogs participated, and three Guinness World Records were broken, including a new record of eighteen for the most dogs photographed on a surfboard. The Imperial Beach Dog Surf Competition is also a fundraiser event for San Diego Humane Society.

An annual dog surfing competition titled "Surf City Surf Dog competition" is held in Huntington Beach, California in late September. The first competition occurred in October 2009. The event is free to attend. Besides the surf competitions, visitors can enjoy the surFUR expo.

Since 2012, the Noosa Festival of Surfing held each March in the Shire of Noosa has played host to the Surfing Dog Championship sponsored by local business VetShopAustralia. The event was formerly known as the Surfing Dog Spectacular and was renamed the Surfing Dog Championships in 2017 in recognition of the increased calibre of participants. The Noosa Surfing Dog Championships is an invitational event, where dogs and humans work together on stand up paddle boards (SUPs) with the prize chosen by surfing legends such as Layne Beachley, and given to the dog/person combination that catches the best wave.

The winner of the 2024 event was staffordshire terrier Bu with owner Dane and the best wipe out award went to kelpie Banjo.

In July 2013, the Big Dog Ranch Rescue in Wellington, Florida presented its first "Surfs Up, Dogs" competition as a fundraiser for the non-profit organization. The competition was held in Jupiter, Florida.

The World Dog Surfing Championships, a Northern California event, have been held at Pacifica, California since 2016.

In September, 2019, "SUP for Pups Intracoastal Challenge", a competitive 5K event took place at Pioneer Park in Deerfield Beach, Florida.

== See also ==
- Horse surfing
- List of dog sports
- Skateboarding dog
- Ricochet (dog)

== Bibliography ==
- Goldish, Meish (August 1, 2012). Surf Dog Miracles. Bearport Publishing. ISBN 1617726443
