= Rusty Keaulana =

American professional longboard surfrider

Russ "Rusty" Keaulana (born 6 March 1966) is a Hawaiian professional longboard surfrider.

Rusty was born on Oahu, Hawaii. He is the son of legendary Hawaiian waterman Richard "Buffalo" Keaulana. He won 3 World Longboard Championships in a row in 1993, 1994 and 1995. In 2010, he entered as a wildcard in an ASP world tour event in Makaha and reached the semifinals. He is renowned as a switchfooter, able to surf with either foot forward. His brother Brian Keaulana is also a notable surfer and is a world-class lifeguard.

== Filmography ==
Keaulana has appeared in about 20 surf movies and videos. In 1999, he starred in Surfer, a TV commercial for Guinness in the United Kingdom.
