= Josh Constable =

Australian surfer

Personal information
- Born: 1 December 1980 (age 45) Noosa Heads, Queensland, Australia
- Website: http://www.joshconstable.com/about.html

Surfing career
- Sport: Surfing
- Major achievements: Asp World Longboard Championship champion 2006

Josh Constable (born 1 December 1980 in Noosa Heads, Queensland) is an Australian professional longboard surfrider.

Josh won his first Asp World Longboard Championship title in 2006 at Boca Barranca, Costa Rica, defeating Ned Snow in the final of the 13th Annual Rabbit Kekai International Longboard Classic. He is 4-time winner of the Noosa Festival of Surfing (2002, 2007, 2008, & 2011) & 5 time Australian longboard Champion (2004, 2008, 2009,2010 & 2025). Josh is also 2 time Australasian LQS Tour Champion (2010 & 2011).
