= Loews Coronado Bay Resort Surf Dog Competition =

The Loews Coronado Bay Resort surf dog competition is an annual event held yearly since 2006 in Imperial Beach, California. In 2014, the name of the event was changed to Unleashed by Petco Surf Dog Competition.

The event is part of an emerging trend of dog surfing contests, especially popular in Southern California, and is run as a fundraiser for animal-related charities.

Dogs compete in ten-minute heats, in which they attempt to catch several waves. There are categories for small, medium, and large dogs. Judging is based on confidence, ability, length of ride, and dog fashion, which can include dog wetsuits and sunglasses.

== See also ==
- List of dog sports
