= Association of Surfing Professionals Australasia =

World Surf League Australasia
- Abbreviation: WSL Australasia
- Formation: 1 January 1989 (37 years ago)
- Type: Sports organisation, Professional Surfing
- Region served: Australasia
- Official language: English
- Main organ: WSL Australasia Board
- Parent organization: World Surf League
- Website: www.worldsurfleague.com

The World Surf League Australasia (WSL Australasia) is the governing body for professional surfers in Australasia and is dedicated to showcasing the continent's best talent in a variety of progressive formats. It is one of seven regions of the World Surf League.

== History ==
=== Creation of the WSL ===
Founded in 1989, the WSL Australasia was formed to promote professional surfing in Australasia. Its objective is to equally benefit Australasian surfers, sponsors and event promoters alike.

== WSL Membership ==
Membership to the WSL is only available to individuals.

== Rules ==
=== Judging ===
In contests surfers will be scored on a scale of 0.1 to 10.0, these scores will be broken up into increments of one-tenth. The following scale can be use in order to relate descriptions with the score:

- 0–1.9 = Poor
- 2.0–3.9 = Fair
- 4.0–5.9 = Average;
- 6.0–7.9 = Good
- 8.0–10.0 = Excellent

=== Judging criteria ===
Judges will base the previous score on how successfully surfers display these following elements in each wave:

- Commitment and degree of difficulty
- Innovative and progressive maneuvers
- Combination of major maneuvers
- Variety of maneuvers
- Speed, power and flow

Some of these elements may be more or less important base on the surfing conditions and the surfing area. This criterion is also different to that of longboarding competitions. All of this is focused on creating some type consistency that can be seen throughout the many different events.

The events themselves are previously declared QS 1,000 - QS 10,000 events; among other things this ranking shows what numbers of judges which are required at the event. QS 1,000 - QS 3,000 Qualifying Series events are required to have a six judge panel with four judges on each heat. A QS 4,000 - QS 6,000 Qualifying Series event requires seven judges with five of those judges on each heat. At QS 5,000 - QS 10,000 Qualifying Series events there are only allowed to be 3 judges from any one region. This is then limited to two at any world championship events. All events also require an WSL approved head judge who has the ability to make corrections to errors or any other events that may have affected the results.

=== Rules ===
There are many rules out in the water which all revolve around the idea of right of way. A surfer has right of way if he or she is closer to the area where the wave is breaking, this is more commonly referred to as having the inside position. If another surfer takes off in front of the surfer which has the inside position then interference will be called and penalties will be enacted. In most circumstances it does not matter who stood up first but who has the inside position.

A surfer can also be found guilty of inference if they catch more than their maximum number of waves in a heat and that this takes away from the other competitors ability to catch waves. A competitor is also not allowed to interfere with another competitor's paddling and maneuvering for a wave.

The rules of right-a-way vary slightly with the type of break. Point Breaks will always have a consistent direct of what is inside, that is the person further up the line will have right-away. In a single peak situation where there is both a left and a right two people are able to be on the wave at the same time provided that one goes left and one goes right and that neither crosses the path of the other to go one direction. If this does happen then the surfer who stood up first will get the right-a-way. On a multi peaked wave where the wave eventually comes together both peaks can be surfed until the surfers come together, when they do the surfer who stood up first has right-a-way and the other must maneuver to get off the wave without interrupting the other surfer.

In a one-on-one competition priority can be declared by the Head Judge. Once the person with priority has paddled for a wave priority is then turned over to the next person until that person does the same. The person with second priority can paddles for waves as long as it does not interfere with the other person and will only lose their priority if they catch a wave.

A surfer who has already taken off or obtained possession of a wave maintains this position until the end of their ride. If another surfer takes off on the inside of this surfer then this person does not obtain priority and is considered to be snaking. If this surfer does not hurt the other surfers ride then both people can be scored based. If the judges determine that the snaking did interfere then the person will be penalized. Interference penalties are called by the judges and must have a majority to be declared an actual penalty. Interferences are shown as triangles on the score cards in various different ways depending on when or where in the heat they were made. If three or more waves are being scored then one wave will be dropped off the score card. If only the top two waves are being scored then 50% of the second best scored wave will be taken off. If a surfer has more than one then 50% of the best waves score will be taken off also. The surfer who has been interfered with will be allowed an additional wave to their maximum as long as it is within the time limit. If a surfer interferes more than twice in a heat then they must leave the competition area.

== See also ==
- World Surf League
