= Duane DeSoto =

American surfer (born 1978)

Personal information
- Born: Spokane, Washington
- Years active: 17 years

Surfing career
- Sport: Surfing
- Best year: Ranked 1st on the ASP World Longboard Championship, 2010
- Major achievements: ASP World Longboard Championship

Duane DeSoto (born 1978 in Spokane, Washington) is an American professional longboard surfrider

DeSoto won the 2010 Oxbow ASP World Longboard Championship, defeating France's Antoine Delpero in the Final at Makaha. In 1997, he finished third in the ASP World Tour. He received the Professional Surfer Award at the 8th Annual John Kelly Environmental Awards in 2010.

DeSoto played Duke Kahanamoku in the 2022 documentary Waterman – Duke: Ambassador of Aloha.
