= Cori Schumacher =

American surfer (born 1977)

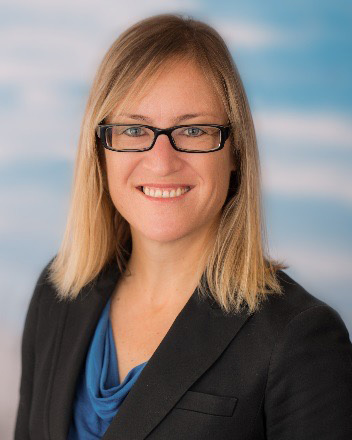
- Schumacher in 2018

Personal information
- Nickname: Cori
- Born: Corinne Schumacher; April 23, 1977 (age 49) Huntington Beach, CA
- Website: corischumacher.com

Surfing career
- Sport: Surfing
- Major achievements: World Longboard Champion 2000, 2001, 2010

Surfing specifications
- Stance: Regular
- Shapers: Donald Takayama

Carlsbad City Council Member
- In office 2016–2021
- Preceded by: Lorraine Wood
- Succeeded by: Melanie Burkholder

Personal details
- Party: Democratic Party

Cori Schumacher (born April 23, 1977, Huntington Beach, California) is an American surfer, activist and former politician. She is a three-time Women's World Longboard Champion, earning the title in 2000, 2001 and 2010.

== Early life ==
Schumacher is the older of two daughters. Her parents were avid surfers, with her mother having professionally competed in the sport. The family moved to San Diego, where Schumacher learned the practice. Her first competition was at age twelve.

== Surfing ==
Schumacher has won multiple national and international surfing titles being best known for women's longboarding. Early in her career, she was a top US female shortboarder on the 1994 and 1996 US Team for the International Surfing Association (ISA). Her most notable international shortboard title was the winner of the 1995 Pan-American Championships. She turned to longboarding and became a three-time Women's World Longboard Champion, earning the title in 2000, 2001 and 2010.

From late 2001 to 2008, Schumacher went on sabbatical from competition and came out as gay. She returned in 2008 to win the Linda Benson Roxy Jam at Cardiff, California, the Women's Longboard Pipeline Pro Champion in 2009, and two-time Association of Surfing Professionals (ASP) North American Champion winning in 2008 and 2009.

While the world champion, in 2011 Schumacher boycotted the ASP Women's Longboard world tour because of an event hosted in Hainan Island, China. In an email to ASP administrators she stated, "I have deep political and personal reservations with being a part of any sort of benefit to a country that actively engages in human-rights violations, specifically those in violation of women." It was the first time since 1985 a professional surfer boycotted a major competition.

During her surfing career, Schumacher chose not to take sponsorships explaining "so I can say what I want to say and be who I want to be," and became known for her protests against the war in Iraq and advocacy for women's and gay rights.

== Activism and political career ==
After boycotting the world surfing tour in 2011, Schumacher directed her focus to social justice work on gender equity and increasing LGBTQ+ and BIPOC representation in surfing. In 2013, she launched a viral online campaign demanding Roxy surf wear stop the sexualization of female professional surfers in their advertisements. The advertisement in question was made by Roxy as the main media for a world championship tour surfing contest in Biarritz, France—an event governed by the Association of Surfing Professionals, who up until the global push back had permitted contest sponsors to control media for professional surfing events.

In 2017, Schumacher published a chapter in the Critical Surf Studies Reader, a seminal anthology introducing the emerging academic field of critical surf studies. Her research focused on the gender pay gap, misogyny, and homophobia within the world of professional surfing.

In 2019, Schumacher worked with California Assembly member Tasha Boerner-Horvath on Assembly Bill 467, California's "Equal Pay for Equal Play" legislation which emerged from conversations between the two. The bill was signed by Governor Gavin Newsom in September 2019 and went into effect January 1, 2020.

=== Politics ===
From 2016 to 2021 Schumacher, a Democrat, was an elected city council member for Carlsbad, California.

In 2016, Schumacher was elected to as an at-large council member having received support for opposing a contentious mall development plan. The community rejected the development plan in a special election in February 2016. Schumacher was the first LGBTQ+ elected official in Carlsbad's history.

Schumacher announced her campaign for mayor of Carlsbad in 2018 with a platform centered on creating a community choice energy program. She lost the election to incumbent mayor Matt Hall.

In April 2020, Schumacher was elected to Carlsbad's District 1 council seat shortly before California went into lock-down due to COVID-19. She initiated a special meeting in January 2021 where she proposed stricter enforcement for restaurants not following California COVID restrictions on indoor dining which failed. In April Schumacher faced a recall led by Republican Carl DeMaio. According to The San Diego Union-Tribune, critics launched the recall effort in part due her to filing restraining orders against three Carlsbad residents which a judge dismissed and ordered her to pay the court costs. Critics also thought her efforts to enforce COVID restrictions hurt small businesses. In July, Schumacher announced her resignation from the council to pursue her education.

In June 2023, Schumacher became the political director for International Brotherhood of Electrical Workers Local 569.

== Personal life ==
Schumacher married Maria De Jesus Cerda in 2008. Schumacher uses they/them and she/her pronouns.
