= World Surf League =

Governing body for professional surfers

- Current season, competition or edition: 2026 World Surf League
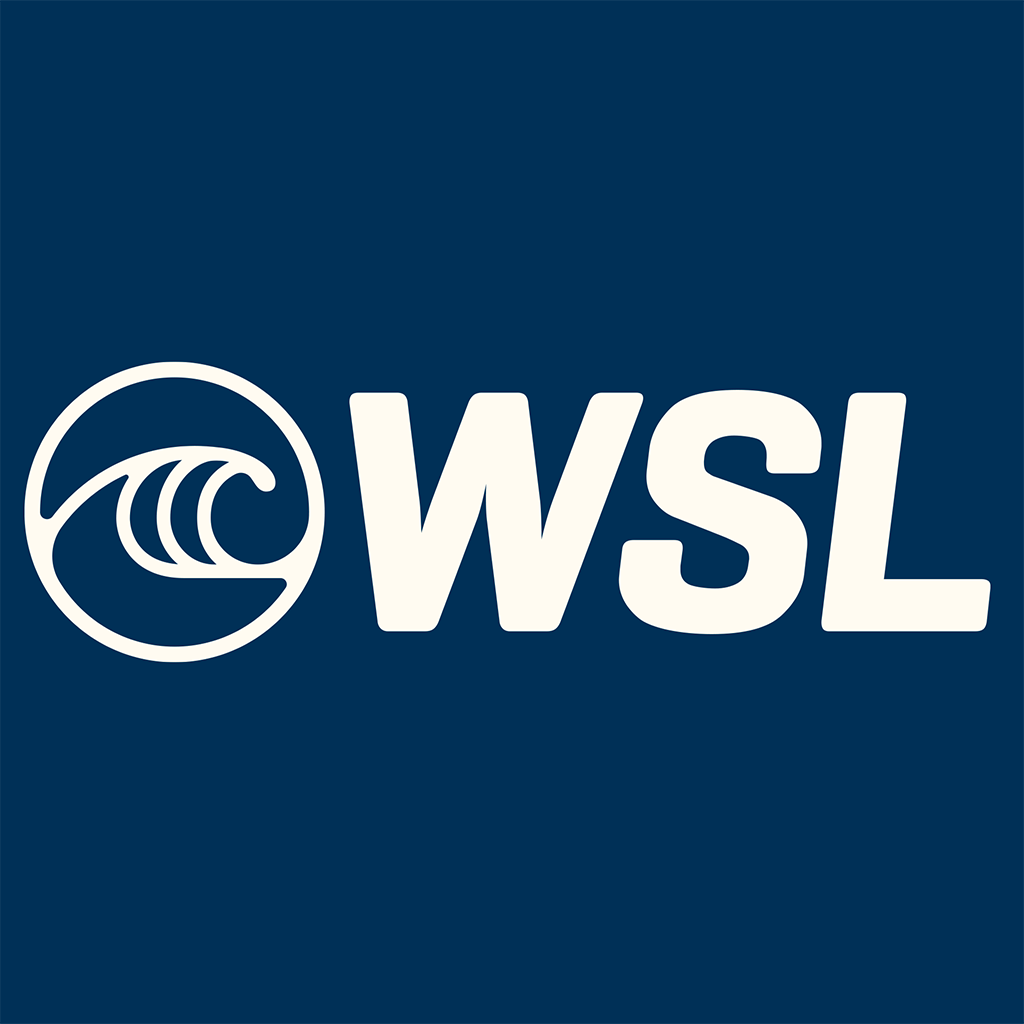
- Sport: Professional surfing
- Founded: 2013
- Countries: International
- Headquarters: Santa Monica, California, US
- Most recent champions: (Brazil) Yago Dora (men) (1st title) (Australia) Molly Picklum (women) (1st title)
- Most titles: (United States) Kelly Slater (men) (11) (Australia) Stephanie Gilmore (women) (8)
- Website: worldsurfleague.com

The World Surf League (WSL) is the governing body for professional surfers and is dedicated to showcasing the world's best talent in a variety of progressive formats. The WSL was originally known as International Professional Surfing (IPS), founded by Fred Hemmings and Randy Rarick in 1976. IPS created the first world circuit of pro surfing events. In 1983, the Association of Surfing Pros (ASP) took over management of the world circuit. In 2013, the ASP was acquired by ZoSea, backed by Paul Speaker, Terry Hardy, and Dirk Ziff. At the start of the 2015 season, the ASP changed its name to the World Surf League.

As of December 2017, the WSL had more than 6.5 million Facebook fans, surpassing more established sports such as the National Hockey League, the Association of Tennis Professionals and Major League Soccer. Sports Business Journal reported that 28 million hours of WSL digital video content were consumed during the 2017 season, making WSL the third most watched sport online in the United States behind NFL and NBA. In January 2018, Forbes reported that the WSL had signed an exclusive deal for digital broadcast rights, with Facebook, worth $30 million over two years.

Sophie Goldschmidt was appointed as WSL CEO on 19 July 2017. Paul Speaker had stepped down as CEO on 11 January 2017, and Dirk Ziff acted as the interim WSL CEO until Goldschmidt's appointment. Erik Logan, former Oprah Winfrey Network (OWN) president and executive vice president at Harpo Studios, was appointed as WSL CEO on 14 January 2020. Logan exited his position as CEO on 29 June 2023. On 11 April 2024, Ryan Crosby was announced as CEO, effective 13 May 2024.

== History ==
=== Predecessors ===
- 1964 to 1972, International Surfing Federation (ISF) held the World Surfing Championships as a single event every two years and was open to all comers.
- 1973 to 1975, Smirnoff World Pro-Am Surfing Championships, occasionally referred to as the de facto professional world championship. The International Surfing Federation had been unable to establish a format or sponsorship so no official amateur championships were held between 1973 and 1975.
- 1976 to 1982, International Professional Surfers founded by Fred Hemmings and Randy Rarick (IPS) was the original world governing body of professional surfing.

The predecessors of the WSL relates to what organization predominantly represented individual professional surfers at that time. This is an important point because the International Surfing Federation (ISF) still functions to this day as the International Surfing Association (ISA) and also refers to competition winners as world champions (or variants thereof).

The Association of Surfing Professionals (ASP) took over administration of professional surfing in 1983 and crowned world champions until 2015 when the organisation was rebranded as World Surf League (WSL). The ASP/WSL has remained the predominant surfing organization and sanctioning body for professional surfers since its formation. The ASP's first world champions were Tom Carroll (men's) and Kim Mearig (women's) in 1983/84. Split seasons were held from 1983/84 until 1988 when competition reverted to calendar basis. This means that Damian Hardman and Wendy Botha were crowned ASP world Champions for 1987/88, while Barton Lynch and Freida Zamba were crowned ASP world champions for the (shortened) 1988 season. The first WSL world champions were Adriano de Souza (BRA) and Carissa Moore (HAW) in 2015.

In March 2015, WSL launched a free downloadable app, which garnered more than a million downloads in its first year. The app provides real-time updates on competitions and provides personalized alerts, letting fans know when their favorite athletes are about to enter the water.

In April 2016, the World Surf League introduced WSL PURE, its philanthropic initiative dedicated to supporting ocean health through research, education and advocacy. WSL PURE has contributed an initial $1.5 million in funding that will support scientists from the Columbia University Lamont–Doherty Earth Observatory, as they lead research into ocean health & ecosystems, ocean acidification, sea-level rise, and the role the oceans play in climate change.

=== Equal pay for athletes in 2019 ===
On 5 September 2018, the World Surf League announced equal pay for every female and male WSL event. CEO Sophie Goldschmidt said, "This is a huge step forward in our long-planned strategy to elevate women's surfing and we are thrilled to make this commitment as we reveal our new 2019 schedule...". The announcement prompted a conversation about equal pay for professional athletes and the world commended the WSL for leading the way. 8 x world surfing champion Stephanie Gilmore said "I hope this serves as a model for other sports, global organizations and society as a whole. My fellow women athletes and I are honored by the confidence in us, and inspired to reward this decision with ever higher levels of surfing.".

=== COVID-19 impact ===
On 14 March 2020 the WSL cancelled all events "for the remainder of March", including the opening event of the 2020 Championship Tour (CT) on the Gold Coast in Australia, and the Papara Pro Open. On 16 March the cancellations were extended to the end of May.

More events were cancelled in January 2021: Sunset, the Big Wave Jaws Championship Pe'ahi, and the Santa Cruz Pro.

== WSL sanctioned tours ==
- WSL Men's Championship Tour (CT)
- WSL Women's Championship Tour (CT)
- WSL Men's Challenger Series (CS)
- WSL Women's Challenger Series (CS)
- WSL Men's Qualifying Series (QS)
- WSL Women's Qualifying Series (QS)
- WSL Men's Longboard Championships
- WSL Women's Longboard Championships
- WSL Junior Championships.
- WSL Big Wave Tour

== WSL Championship tour ==
Event winners win a total of $100.000. Total prize pool per event in men's competition is $607,800 and for women's $420,800, as there are fewer competition spots available to the women. Event results are converted to points and count towards the World Title Race, the surfers with the most points by the end of the season are considered as world surfing champions.

The Men's Championship Tour (CT) is the men's elite competition consisting of the best 34 professional surfers competing in 11 events (as of 2015).

== WSL Qualifying Series events ==
Surfers who are not currently eligible for the Championship Tour (CT) events are able to compete in a Qualifying Series (QS) of events, earning points towards qualifying for the following year's CT. The top Qualifiers at the end of each season's QS receive invitations, with the exact number on invitations having changed slightly from season to season. Furthermore, if a particular CT event, in the current season, is short of CT competitors, the judges may choose to select from the then-current top ranked QS surfers to fill in for that event – though this does not guarantee that the QS surfer will be invited to other events during the current season.

A WSL QS 10,000 event is held at premium venues with a restricted field and offers WSL QS 10,000 World Rankings points.

A WSL QS 1000, 1500, 3000 event is a lower level of competition, compared to an WSL QS 6000 and 10,000 event, with their importance indicated by how many points they are assigned: more points means generally better competition and prize money.

== WSL world ranking ==
WSL Men's Championship Tour and WSL Women's Championship Tour surfers accumulate points from each WSL Championship Tour and WSL Qualifying Series event they compete in which count towards their WSL World Ranking. Accumulated points are valid for 12 months from the final date of the scheduled event in which they were earned.

=== Promotion and relegation ===
WSL World Ranking determines the promotion or relegation of surfers.

==== 2012 tours ====
The qualifiers for the 2012 ASP World Tour top 34 surfers was determined using a Rotation Points system.

The qualifiers for the 2012 ASP Women's World Tour was determined by a surfer's rank at the conclusion of the 2011 Tour. The top 10 re-qualified for 2012 and the remaining 7 places were taken from the ASP Star Ranking.

==== 2013-2018 tours ====
The qualifiers for the following year's WSL Men's Championship Tour top 34 surfers will consist of:

- Top 22 surfers from the previous season of the WSL World Title Rankings;
- Top 10 surfers from the previous season of the WSL World Qualifying Series (QS) Rankings (those who haven't already qualified in the above) and
- 2 WSL wildcards.

== Rules ==
=== Judging ===
In contests surfers are scored on a scale of 0.1 to 10.0. These scores are awarded in increments of one-tenth. The following scale can be used to relate descriptions to the scores:

- 0–1.9 = Poor
- 2.0–3.9 = Fair
- 4.0–5.9 = Average
- 6.0–7.9 = Good
- 8.0–10.0 = Excellent

Judges base the score on how successfully surfers display the following elements in each wave:

- Commitment and degree of difficulty
- Innovative and progressive maneuvers
- Wave selection
- Variety of maneuvers
- Speed, power and flow

These elements may be weighted differently from day to day and event to event, depending on the surfing conditions and the type of breaking wave at each event location. These criteria are different from in longboarding competitions. All is focused on creating some type consistency that can be seen throughout the many different events.

The events themselves are previously declared QS 1,000 - QS 10,000 events; among other things this ranking shows how many judges are required at the event. QS 1,000 - QS 3,000 Qualifying Series events are required to have a six judge panel with four judges on each heat. A QS 4,000 - QS 6,000 Qualifying Series event requires seven judges with five on each heat. At QS 5,000 - QS 10,000 Qualifying Series events there are only allowed to be 3 judges from any one region. This is then limited to two at any world championship events. All events also require an WSL approved head judge who has the ability to make corrections to errors or any other events that may have affected the results.

=== Rules ===
There are many rules out in the water that all revolve around the idea of right of way. A surfer has the right of way if he or she is closer to the area where the wave is breaking, this is more commonly referred to as having the inside position. If another surfer takes off in front of the surfer that has the inside position, then interference will be called, and penalties will be enacted. In most circumstances it does not matter who stood up first but who has the inside position.

A surfer can also be found guilty of interference if they catch more than their maximum number of waves in a heat and that this takes away from the other competitors ability to catch waves. A competitor is also not allowed to interfere with another competitor's paddling and maneuvering for a wave.

The rules of right of way vary slightly with the type of break. Point Breaks will always have a consistent direct of what is inside, that is, the person further up the line will have right of way. In a single peak situation where there is both a left and a right two people are able to be on the wave at the same time, provided that one goes left and one goes right and that neither crosses the path of the other to go one direction. If this does happen then, the surfer who stood up first will get the right of way. On a multi-peaked wave where the wave eventually comes together, both peaks can be surfed until the surfers come together. When they do the surfer who stood up first has right of way, and the other must maneuver to get off the wave without interrupting the other surfer.

In a one-on-one competition, priority can be declared by the Head Judge. Once the person with priority has paddled for a wave priority is then turned over to the next person until that person does the same. The person with second priority can paddle for waves as long as it does not interfere with the other person who will lose their priority only if they catch a wave.

A surfer who has already taken off or obtained possession of a wave maintains this position until the end of their ride. If another surfer takes off on the inside of this surfer, then this person does not obtain priority and is considered to be snaking. If this surfer does not hurt the other surfers ride, then both people can be scored based. If the judges determine that the snaking did interfere then the person will be penalized. Interference penalties are called by the judges and must have a majority to be declared an actual penalty. Interference are shown as triangles on the score cards in various different ways depending on when or where in the heat they were made. If three or more waves are being scored than one wave will be dropped off the score card. If only the top two waves are being scored, then 50% of the second best-scored wave will be taken off. If a surfer has more than one then 50% of the best waves score will be taken off also. The surfer who has been interfered with will be allowed an additional wave to their maximum as long as it is within the time limit. If a surfer interferes more than twice in a heat then they must leave the competition area.

== WSL Championship Tour champions ==
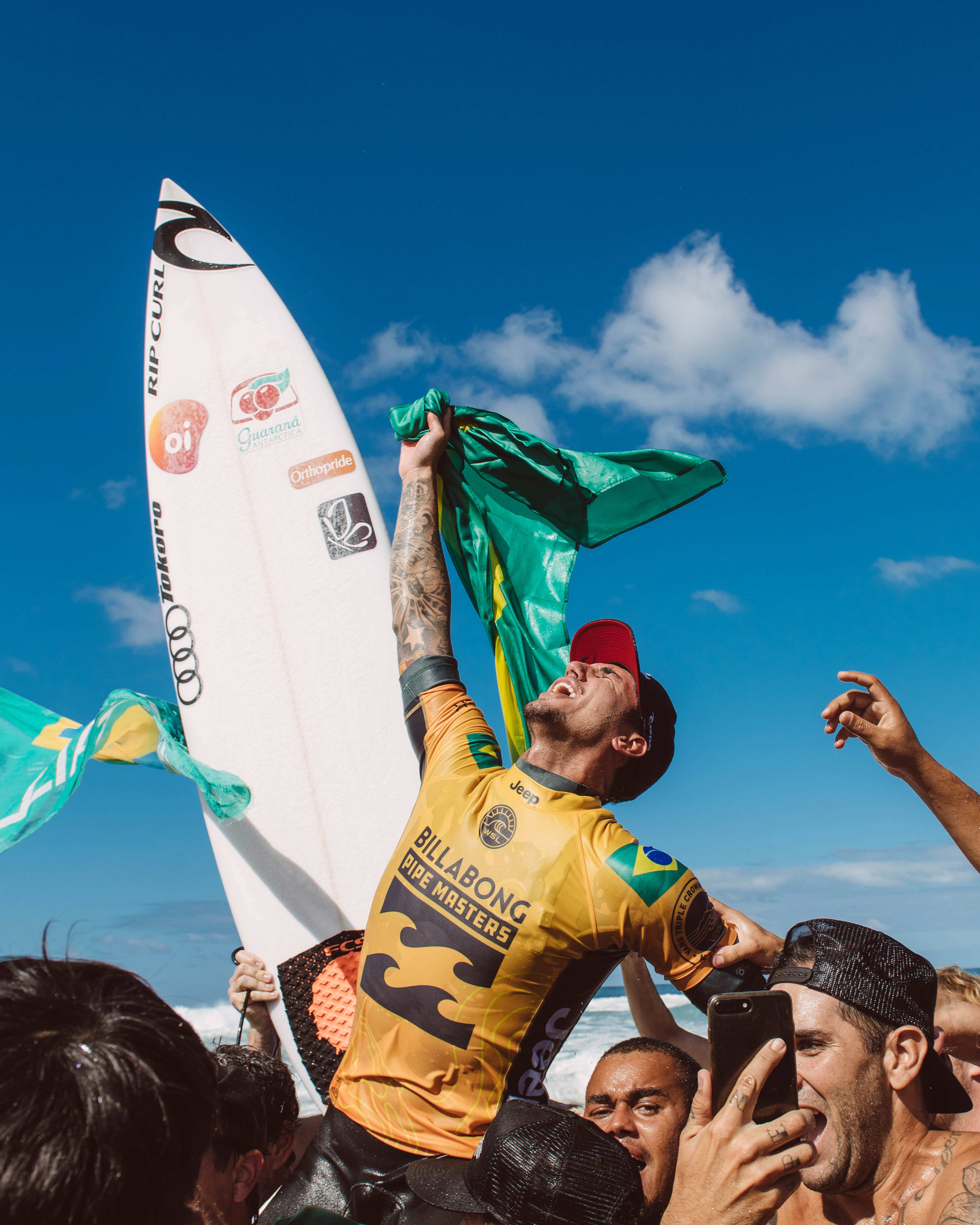
Gabriel Medina, 2018 WSL Championship Tour Champion

Annual Championship Tour champions, since 1964, as recorded by World Surf League and correct as of 8 September 2022.

Year	Men's Championship Tour		Women's Championship Tour	
Year	Name	Points	Name	Points
ISF World Surfing Championships
1964 - Manly, AUS	Midget Farrelly (AUS)	–	Phyllis O'Donnell (AUS)	–
1965 - Punta Rocas, Peru	Felipe Pomar (PER)	–	Joyce Hoffman (USA)	–
1966 - San Diego, USA	Nat Young (AUS)	–	Joyce Hoffman^{[2]} (USA)	–
1968 - Rincon, Puerto Rico, PR	Fred Hemmings (USA)	–	Margo Godfrey (USA)	–
1970 - Torquay / Lorne / Johanna, AUS	Rolf Aurness (USA)	–	Sharon Webber (USA)	–
1972 - San Diego, USA	Jimmy Blears (USA)	–	Sharon Webber^{[2]} (USA)	–
Smirnoff World Pro-Am Surfing Championships
1973	Ian Cairns (AUS)	–	–	–
1974	Reno Abellira (USA)	–	–	–
1975	Mark Richards (AUS)	–	–	–
IPS World Circuit
1976	Peter Townend (AUS)	5,593	–	–
1977	Shaun Tomson (RSA)	5,948.3	Margo Oberg (USA)	4,850
1978	Wayne Bartholomew (AUS)	5,749.25	Lynne Boyer (USA)	3,986.14
1979	Mark Richards ^{[2]} (AUS)	6,781.14	Lynne Boyer ^{[2]} (USA)	3,722.50
1980	Mark Richards ^{[3]} (AUS)	6,890	Margo Oberg ^{[2]} (USA)	2,000
1981	Mark Richards ^{[4]} (AUS)	6,211.52	Margo Oberg ^{[3]} (USA)	3,850
1982	Mark Richards ^{[5]} (AUS)	6,917	Debbie Beacham (USA)	3,059.14
ASP World Tour
1983/84	Tom Carroll (AUS)	6,830	Kim Mearig (USA)	3,125
1984/85	Tom Carroll ^{[2]} (AUS)	9,460.38	Freida Zamba (USA)	3,400
1985/86	Tom Curren (USA)	11,490	Freida Zamba ^{[2]} (USA)	5,320
1986/87	Tom Curren ^{[2]} (USA)	13,115	Freida Zamba ^{[3]} (USA)	9,230
1987/88	Damien Hardman (AUS)	13,690	Wendy Botha (RSA)	8,220
1988	Barton Lynch (AUS)	17,475	Freida Zamba ^{[4]} (USA)	7,960
1989	Martin Potter (UK)	20,665	Wendy Botha ^{[2]} (AUS)	14,380
1990	Tom Curren ^{[3]} (USA)	17,612	Pam Burridge (AUS)	14,440
1991	Damien Hardman ^{[2]} (AUS)	12,854	Wendy Botha ^{[3]} (AUS)	7,424
1992	Kelly Slater (USA)	7,765	Wendy Botha ^{[4]} (AUS)	10,205
1993	Derek Ho (HAW)	5,510	Pauline Menczer (AUS)	7,080
1994	Kelly Slater ^{[2]} (USA)	6,660	Lisa Andersen (USA)	7,650
1995	Kelly Slater ^{[3]} (USA)	6,040	Lisa Andersen ^{[2]} (USA)	12,920
1996	Kelly Slater ^{[4]} (USA)	9,540	Lisa Andersen ^{[3]} (USA)	12,750
1997	Kelly Slater ^{[5]} (USA)	8,260	Lisa Andersen ^{[4]} (USA)	8,520
1998	Kelly Slater ^{[6]} (USA)	6,398	Layne Beachley (AUS)	7,920
1999	Mark Occhilupo (AUS)	7,120	Layne Beachley ^{[2]} (AUS)	8,080
2000	Sunny Garcia (HAW)	7,270	Layne Beachley ^{[3]} (AUS)	5,730
2001	C. J. Hobgood (USA)	3,094	Layne Beachley ^{[4]} (AUS)	1,760
2002	Andy Irons (HAW)	8,102	Layne Beachley ^{[5]} (AUS)	3,200
2003	Andy Irons ^{[2]} (HAW)	8,964	Layne Beachley ^{[6]} (AUS)	3,696
2004	Andy Irons ^{[3]} (HAW)	7,824	Sofia Mulanovich (PER)	5,484
2005	Kelly Slater ^{[7]} (USA)	7,962	Chelsea Georgeson (AUS)	7,080
2006	Kelly Slater ^{[8]} (USA)	8,124	Layne Beachley ^{[7]} (AUS)	6,374
2007	Mick Fanning (AUS)	8,136	Stephanie Gilmore (AUS)	6,708
2008	Kelly Slater ^{[9]} (USA)	8,042	Stephanie Gilmore ^{[2]} (AUS)	7,188
2009	Mick Fanning ^{[2]} (AUS)	7,140	Stephanie Gilmore ^{[3]} (AUS)	6,169
2010	Kelly Slater ^{[10]} (USA)	69,000	Stephanie Gilmore ^{[4]} (AUS)	7,284
2011	Kelly Slater ^{[11]} (USA)	68,100	Carissa Moore (HAW)	55,000
2012	Joel Parkinson (AUS)	58,700	Stephanie Gilmore ^{[5]} (AUS)	48,400
2013	Mick Fanning ^{[3]} (AUS)	54,400	Carissa Moore ^{[2]} (HAW)	59,500
2014	Gabriel Medina (BRA)	62,800	Stephanie Gilmore ^{[6]} (AUS)	64,200
WSL
2015	Adriano De Souza (BRA)	57,700	Carissa Moore ^{[3]} (HAW)	66,200
2016	John John Florence (HAW)	59,850	Tyler Wright (AUS)	72,500
2017	John John Florence ^{[2]} (HAW)	58,100	Tyler Wright ^{[2]} (AUS)	54,400
2018	Gabriel Medina ^{[2]} (BRA)	62,490	Stephanie Gilmore ^{[7]} (AUS)	61,175
2019	Italo Ferreira (BRA)	59,740	Carissa Moore ^{[4]} (HAW)	59,940
2020	Cancelled due to COVID-19 pandemic			
2021	Gabriel Medina ^{[3]} (BRA)	43,400	Carissa Moore ^{[5]} (HAW)	37,700
2022	Filipe Toledo (BRA)	54,690	Stephanie Gilmore ^{[8]} (AUS)	46,370
2023	Filipe Toledo ^{[2]} (BRA)	58,300	Caroline Marks (USA)	59,870
2024	John John Florence ^{[3]} (HAW)	49,530	Caitlin Simmers (USA)	52,930
2025	Yago Dora (BRA)	54,750	Molly Picklum (AUS)	71,145

=== Surfers with the most World Tour wins (Men) ===
Position	Name	Nation	Events Won
1°	Kelly Slater	United States	56
2°	Tom Curren	United States	33
3°	Tom Carroll	Australia	26
4°	Mick Fanning	Australia	22
5°	Andy Irons	Hawaii	20
6°	Gabriel Medina	Brazil	19
6°	Damien Hardman	Australia	19
8°	Filipe Toledo	Brazil	18
9°	Barton Lynch	Australia	17
9°	Mark Richards	Australia	17
11°	Martin Potter	United Kingdom	16
12°	Joel Parkinson	Australia	12
12°	Mark Occhilupo	Australia	12
12°	Cheyne Horan	Australia	12
12°	Shaun Tomson	South Africa	12
12°	Taj Burrow	Australia	12

== WSL Longboard Championship Tour champions ==
Annual Longboard champions, since Men's event started in 1986/87 and Women's in 1999, as recorded by World Surf League and correct as of 03 December 2025.

Year	WSL Men's World Longboard Tour		WSL Women's World Longboard Tour	
Year	Name	Points	Name	Points
1986/87	Nat Young (AUS)	–	–	–
1987/88	Stuart Entwistle (AUS)	–	–	–
1988	Nat Young ^{[2]} (AUS)	–	–	–
1989	Nat Young ^{[3]} (AUS)	–	–	–
1990	Nat Young ^{[4]} (AUS)	–	–	–
1991	Martin McMillan (AUS)	–	–	–
1992	Joey Hawkins (USA)	–	–	–
1993	Rusty Keaulana (USA)	–	–	–
1994	Rusty Keaulana ^{[2]} (USA)	–	–	–
1995	Rusty Keaulana ^{[3]} (USA)	–	–	–
1996	Bonga Perkins (USA)	–	–	–
1997	Dino Miranda (USA)	–	–	–
1998	Joel Tudor (USA)	–	–	–
1999	Colin McPhillips (USA)	–	Daize Shayne (USA)	–
2000	Beau Young (AUS)	–	Cori Schumacher (USA)	–
2001	Colin McPhillips ^{[2]} (USA)	–	Cori Schumacher ^{[2]} (USA)	–
2002	Colin McPhillips ^{[3]} (USA)	–	Kim Hamrock (USA)	–
2003	Beau Young ^{[2]} (AUS)	–	Daize Shayne^{[2]} (USA)	–
2004	Joel Tudor ^{[2]} (USA)	–	Summer Romero (USA)	–
2005	Cancelled	–	Kristy Murphy (USA)	–
2006	Josh Constable (AUS)	–	Schuyler McFerran (USA)	–
2007	Phil Rajzman (BRA)	–	Jennifer Smith (USA)	–
2008	Bonga Perkins^{[2]} (USA)	–	Joy Magelssen Monahan (USA)	–
2009	Harley Ingleby (AUS)	–	Jennifer Smith^{[2]} (USA)	–
2010	Duane DeSoto (USA)	–	Cori Schumacher^{[3]} (USA)	–
2011	Taylor Jensen (USA)	16,000	Lindsay Steinriede (USA)	15,200
2012	Taylor Jensen^{[2]} (USA)	-	Kelia Moniz (USA)	-
2013	Piccolo Clemente (PER)	-	Kelia Moniz^{[2]} (USA)	-
2014	Harley Ingleby^{[2]} (AUS)	10,000	Chelsea Williams (AUS)	10,000
2015	Piccolo Clemente^{[2]} (PER)	10,000	Rachael Tilly (USA)	10,000
2016	Phil Rajzman^{[2]} (BRA)	10,000	Tory Gilkerson (USA)	10,000
2017	Taylor Jensen^{[3]} (USA)	15,200	Honolua Blomfield (USA)	16,500
2018	Steven Sawyer (ZAF)	10,000	Soleil Errico (USA)	10,000
2019	Justin Quintal (USA)	18,500	Honolua Blomfield^{[2]} (USA)	20,500
2020	Cancelled due to COVID-19 pandemic			
2021	Joel Tudor^{[3]} (USA)	20,000	Honolua Blomfield^{[3]} (USA)	20,500
2022	Harrison Roach (AUS)	15,000	Soleil Errico^{[2]} (USA)	13,042
2023	Kai Sallas (USA)	18,085	Soleil Errico^{[3]} (USA)	20,830
2024	Taylor Jensen^{[4]} (USA)	10,000	Rachael Tilly^{[2]} (USA)	7,282
2025	Kai Ellice-Flint (AUS)		Rachael Tilly^{[2]} (USA)	

== WSL World Junior champions ==
Annual Junior champions, since Men's event started in 1998 and Women's in 2005, as recorded by the Association of Surfing Pros through to 2012.

List winners of junior surfing world championship

Year	WSL Men's World Junior		WSL Women's World Junior	
Year	Name	Points	Name	Points
1998	Andy Irons (USA)	-	-	-
1999	Joel Parkinson (AUS)	-	-	-
2000	Pedro Henrique (BRA)	-	-	-
2001	Joel Parkinson^{[2]} (AUS)	-	-	-
2002	Cancelled (no dates available)	-	-	-
2003	Adriano De Souza (BRA)	-	-	-
2004	Pablo Paulino (BRA)	-	-	-
2005	Kekoa Bacalso (USA)	-	Jessi Miley-Dyer (AUS)	-
2006	Jordy Smith (ZAF)	-	Nicola Atherton (AUS)	-
2007	Pablo Paulino^{[2]} (BRA)	-	Sally Fitzgibbons (AUS)	-
2008	Kai Barger (USA)	–	Pauline Ado (FRA)	-
2009	Maxime Huscenot (FRA)	-	Laura Enever (AUS)	-
2010	Jack Freestone (AUS)	-	Alizee Arnaud (FRA)	-
2011	Caio Ibelli (BRA)	-	Leila Hurst (USA)	-
2012	Jack Freestone^{[2]} (AUS)	-	Nikki van Dijk (AUS)	-
2013	Gabriel Medina (BRA)	-	Ella Williams (NZL)	-
2014	Vasco Ribeiro (POR)	18.63	Mahina Maeda (USA)	13.56
2015	Lucas Silveira (BRA)	16.17	Isabella Nichols (AUS)	18.30
2016	Ethan Ewing (AUS)	11.34	Macy Callaghan (AUS)	15.67
2017	Finn McGill (USA)	16.90	Vahine Fierro (PYF)	13.83
2018	Mateus Herdy (BRA)	-	Kirra Pinkerton (USA)	-
2019	Lucas Vicente (BRA)	17.41	Amuro Tsuzuki (JPN)	13.00
2020	Cancelled due to COVID-19 pandemic			
2021	Cancelled due to COVID-19 pandemic			
2022	Cancelled due to COVID-19 pandemic			
2023	Jarvis Earle (AUS)	17.00	Francisca Veselko (POR)	12.47
2024	Jett Schilling (USA)	16.23	Sierra Kerr (AUS)	16.83
2025	Bronson Meydi (INA)	18.80	Luana Silva (BRA)	12.23
2026	Dane Henry (AUS)	13.67	Isla Huppatz (AUS)	12.67

== WSL Big Wave Tour champions ==
Annual Big Wave champions, since Men's event started in 2009 and Women's in 2016, as recorded by ... and correct as of ...

Year	WSL World Big Wave Tour		WSL Women's World Big Wave Tour	
Year	Name	Points	Name	Points
2009	Carlos Burle (BRA)	2,443		
2010	Jamie Sterling (USA)	2,509		
2011	Peter Mel (USA)	1,472		
2012	Greg Long (USA)	2,155		
2013	Grant Baker (RSA)	2,459		
2014	Makuakai Rothman (USA)	20,833		
2015	Greg Long (USA)	21,266		
2016	Grant Baker (RSA)	25,018	Paige Alms (USA)	12,500
2017	Billy Kemper (USA)	27,140	Paige Alms (USA)	10,000
2018	Grant Baker (RSA)	16,305	Keala Kennelly (USA)	12,100
2019	XXL Biggest Wave	Kai Lenny (HAW)	Justine Dupont (FRA)	
2019	Paddle of the year	Grant Baker (RSA)	Andrea Moller (USA)	
2019	Overall performance	Kai Lenny (USA)	Justine Dupont (FRA)	
2019	Wipeout of the year	Makuakai Rothman (USA)		
2019	Ride of the year	Grant Baker (RSA)		
2020	XXL Biggest Wave	Kai Lenny (USA)	Maya Gabeira (BRA)	
2020	Paddle of the year	Eli Olson (USA)	Paige Alms (USA)	
2020	Overall performance	Kai Lenny (USA)	Justine Dupont (FRA)	
2020	Wipeout of the year		Keala Kennelly (USA)	
2020	Ride of the year	Billy Kemper (USA)	Justine Dupont (FRA)	
2021	Biggest Tow	Sebastian Steudtner (GER)	Justine Dupont (FRA)	
2021	Paddle of the year	Kai Lenny (USA)	Paige Alms (USA)	
2021	Overall performance	Kai Lenny (USA)	Justine Dupont (FRA)	
2021	Ride of the year	Peter Mel (USA)	Justine Dupont (FRA)	
2022	Biggest Tow	Mason Barnes (USA)	Justine Dupont (FRA)	
2022	Paddle of the year	Billy Kemper (USA)	Annie Reickert (USA)	
2022	Overall performance			
2022	Ride of the year	Francisco Porcella (ITA)	Justine Dupont (FRA)	

== Men's Triple Crown Champions ==
Year	WSL Triple Crown Champions	
Year	Name	Points
1983	Michael Ho (USA)	-
1984	Derek Ho (USA)	-
1985	Michael Ho (USA)	-
1986	Derek Ho (USA)	-
1987	Tom Carroll (AUS)	-
1988	Derek Ho (USA)	-
1989	Gary Elkerton (AUS)	-
1990	Derek Ho (USA)	-
1991	Tom Carroll (AUS)	-
1992	Sunny Garcia (USA)	-
1993	Sunny Garcia (USA)	-
1994	Sunny Garcia (USA)	-
1995	Kelly Slater (USA)	-
1996	Kaipo Jaquias (USA)	-
1997	Michael Rommelse (AUS)	-
1998	Kelly Slater (USA)	-
1999	Sunny Garcia (USA)	-
2000	Sunny Garcia (USA)	-
2001	Myles Padaca (USA)	-
2002	Andy Irons (USA)	-
2003	Andy Irons (USA)	-
2004	Sunny Garcia (USA)	-
2005	Andy Irons (USA)	-
2006	Andy Irons (USA)	-
2007	Bede Durbidge (AUS)	-
2008	Joel Parkinson (AUS)	-
2009	Joel Parkinson (AUS)	-
2010	Joel Parkinson (AUS)	-
2011	John John Florence (USA)	-
2012	Sebastian Zietz (USA)	-
2013	John John Florence (USA)	-
2014	Julian Wilson (AUS)	-
2015	Gabriel Medina (BRA)	-
2016	John John Florence (USA)	-
2017	Griffin Colapinto (USA)	-
2018	Jessé Mendes (BRA)	17,100
2019	Kelly Slater (USA)	13,900
2020	John John Florence (USA)	11.17
2021	John John Florence (USA)	-
2023	Finn McGill (USA)	-

NOTE: Only one event of the 2020 Triple Crown was held because of the pandemic.

== Top nations ==
Nation	Championship Tour (CT) (men & women)	Junior Championships (JC) (boys & girls)	Big Wave Championship Tour (BW) (men & women)	Longboard Championships (LC) (men & women)	Total
United States	41	8	25	45	119
Australia	45	15	–	13	74
Brazil	8	10	2	2	21
Hawaii	13	0	1	0	14
South Africa	2	1	5	1	7
Peru	2	–	–	2	4
France	–	3	9	–	3
Portugal	–	2	–	–	2
United Kingdom	1	–	–	–	1
French Polynesia	–	1	–	–	1
New Zealand	–	1	–	–	1
Japan	–	1	–	–	1
Indonesia	–	1	–	–	1
Germany	–	–	1	–	1
Italy	–	–	1	–	1

== See also ==
- The International Surfing Association, an international surfing authority with 86 current members, including the United States and Australia. Throughout 2015, the ISA attempted to reach 100 members to bring surfing to the Olympic Games. On August 3, 2016, the International Olympic Committee (IOC) confirmed surfing as an event at the Tokyo 2020 Olympic Games.
- Quiksilver Pro Gold Coast
- Rip Curl Pro
- Billabong Pro Teahupoo
- Quiksilver Pro France
- Billabong Pipeline Masters
- Roxy Pro Gold Coast
- World Surf League Australasia
- World Surf League Europe
- MEO Rip Curl Pro Portugal
