= Noosa Surfing Dog Championship =

Australian annual dog surfing contest

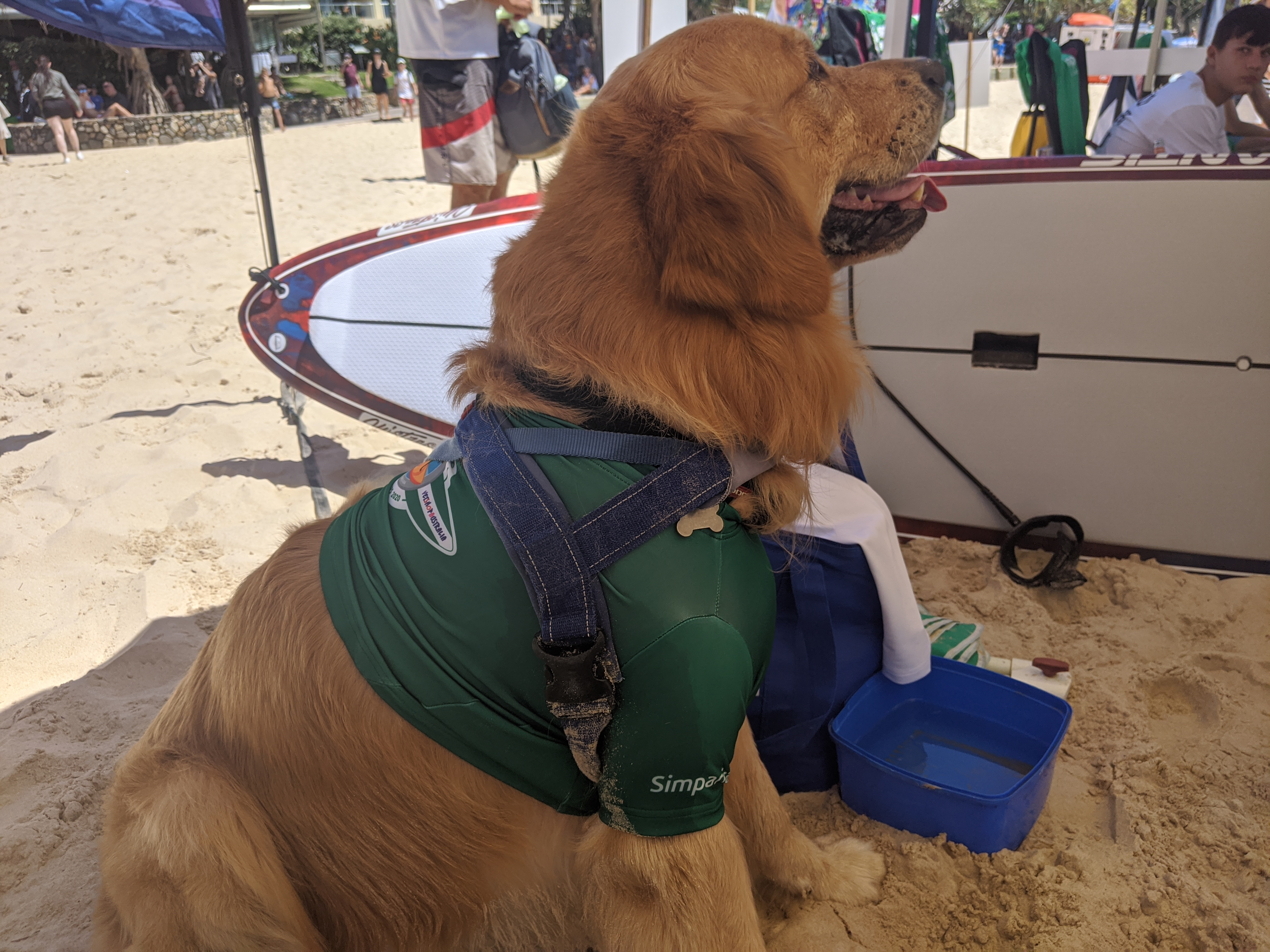
Echo the Golden Retriever shows off his rashie at the 2020 VetShopAustralia Surfing Dog Championships

The Noosa Surfing Dog Championship, officially called the VetShopAustralia Surfing Dog Championships, is an annual dog surfing contest held in Noosa, Australia as part of the Noosa Festival of Surfing. It was founded in 2012 and is organized by online retailer, VetShopAustralia.

== Competition ==
The championship comprises a single, invitational event in which 8 to 10 teams of dogs and humans on stand-up paddle boards compete to win the Best Wave Award. The award is judged on skill, coordination between dog and person, and entertainment value. One of the competing dog owners claims: "Spike turns from casual family dog into hyper hound when he sees a glimpse of the beach and will no doubt want to get his paws submerged and on the trophy one more time."

The VetShopAustralia Surfing Dog Championships usually takes place at Noosa Main Beach on the first or second Saturday of March.

The VetShopAustralia Surfing Dog Championship is understood to be the only surfing dog championship event in Australia and is reportedly the largest dog surfing event in the world. Other surfing dog events are held in the US and the UK.

The Australian event is not related to the Norcal Dog Surfing event & World Championships held in California, USA.

== History ==
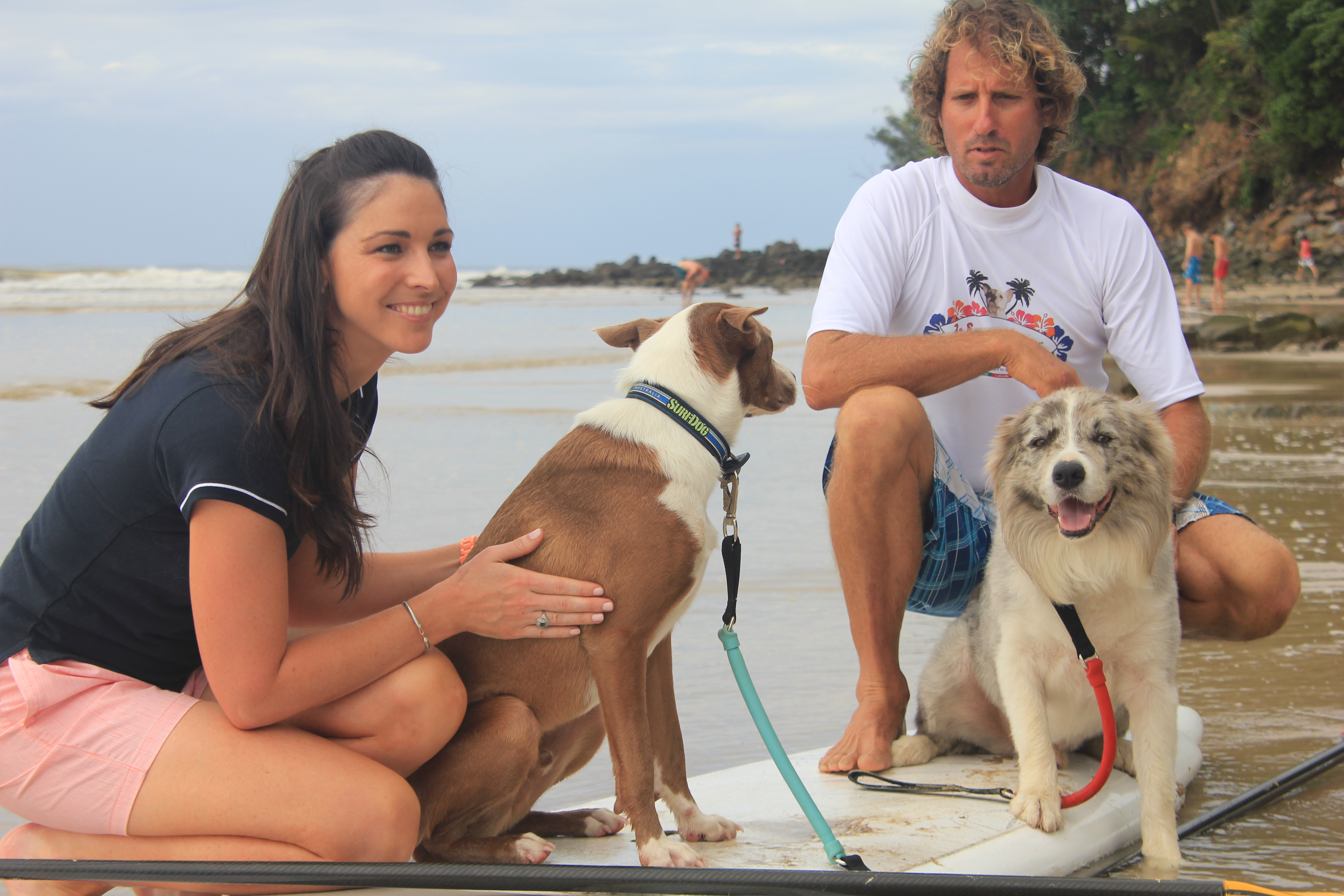
Giaan Rooney and Chris de Aboitiz are pictured at the 2012 Surfing Dog Spectacular, sponsored by VetShopAustralia

The event was first held in 2012 and was called the VetShopAustralia Surfing Dog Spectacular. It has since been held annually as part of the Noosa Festival of Surfing. In 2018, the event was renamed the Surfing Dog Championships in recognition of the increased quality of surfing from the competitors and the competitive nature of the event

=== 2012 ===
The inaugural VetShopAustralia.com.au Surfing Dog Spectacular took place on Sunday, 11 March 2012 and proved to be the highlight of the Noosa Festival of Surfing opening ceremony, giving former pros and surf legends a run for their money in the popularity stakes. Crowds swarmed as the surf dogs lined up and prepared to show off their doggy surfing skills to the world. The four-legged contestants did not disappoint, with an exciting display of surfing given by each of the furry surfers.

The 2012 event was preceded by a Teach Your Dog to Surf Clinic which was hosted by VetShopAustralia.com.au and Chris de Aboitiz of Natural Balance at Noosa, Queensland, Australia.

No winner was announced for the 2012 event.

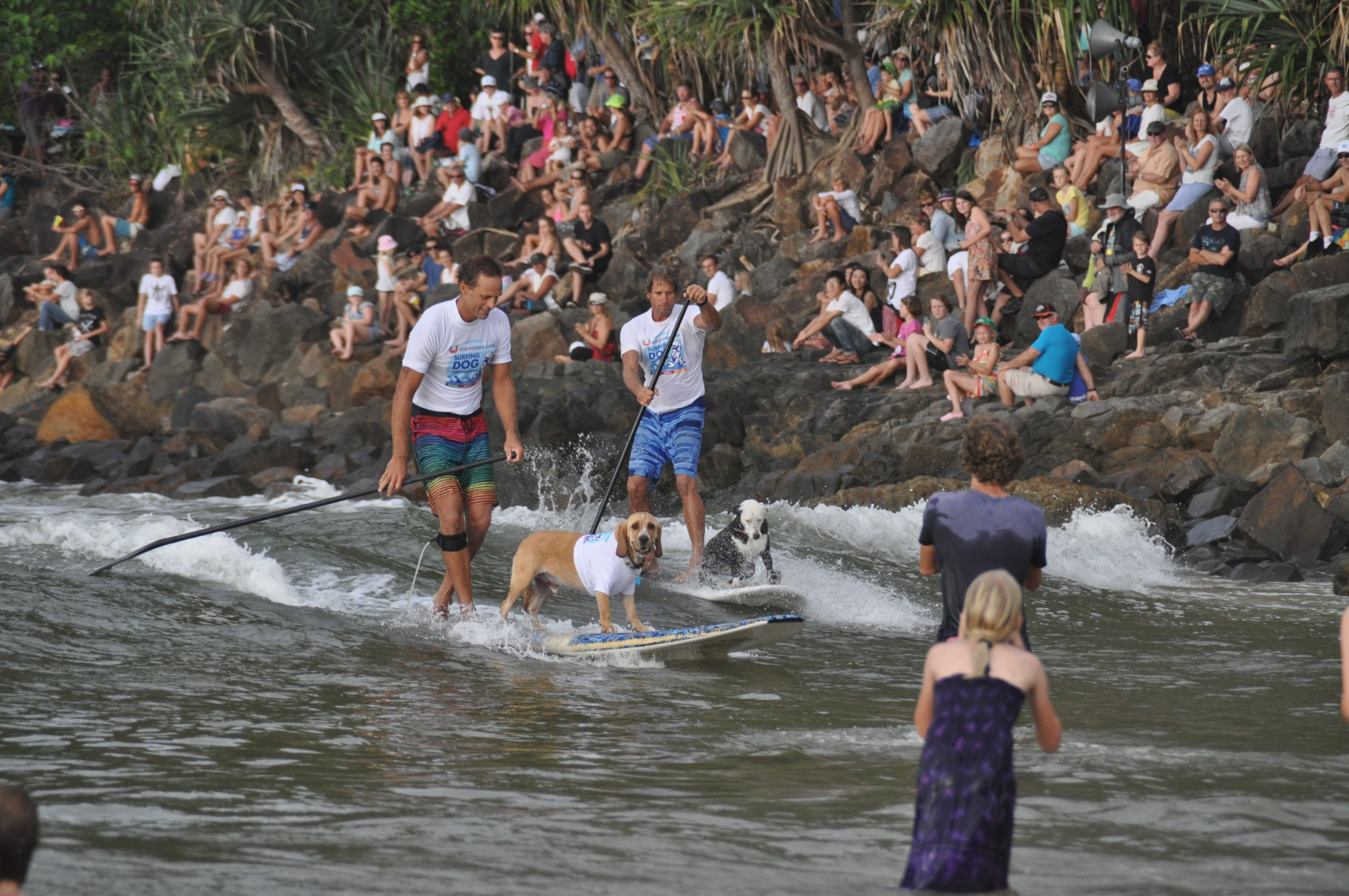
2013 Best Wave Award Winner Jonesy (front, colourful board shorts) and his dog Hugsley catch a wave next to Chris de Aboitiz (rear, blue board shorts) and his dog Lani

=== 2013 ===
The VetShopAustralia.com.au Surfing Dog Spectacular had even more woofs and waves when it was held for the second time on 10 March 2013. The 2013 Spectacular marked the second year in a row the competition was held as the opening event of the Noosa Festival of Surfing. Festival organizers were keen to have the doggie surfing stars back again this year after they drew a crowd large enough to rival the spectators of the professional (people) surfing competition.

The Surfing Dog Spectacular was again headlined by Chris de Aboitiz, a former tandem surfing world champion and professional dog trainer. Chris combines his two passions by surfing with his three dogs - known affectionately as The Pack. He has spread the word about dog surfing, which is often found to strengthen the bond between pet and owner.

The winner of the 2013 Best Wave Award was Paul "Jonesy" Jones and Opal Jones with their dog Hugsley.

=== 2014 ===
The 2014 event was held on Sunday, 9 March to another packed crowd at Noosa Main Beach. Seasoned dog surfer Chris de Aboitiz and his talented pack of surfing dogs, Rama, a Border Collie cross and Murph, an Australian Shepherd, were joined in the water by a stellar cast of furry competitors. Hugsley, a Spanador (Cocker Spaniel x Labrador) and last year's winner of the Best Wave award, was joined in the surf by Patches, a Jack Russell x Fox Terrier x Cattle Dog, Indi, a Border Collie, and northern New South Wales newbies, Pepper, a Staffie x and Kosta, a Bulldog x Mastiff.

The winner of the 2014 Best Wave Award was Morgan and Jesse Dittman with their dog Kosta.

=== 2015 ===
The 2015 event was held on Sunday, 8 March and saw VetShopAustralia partner with GoPro to kit out the dogs in waterproof cameras that captured their unique view from on the board.

The winner of the 2014 Best Wave Award was Paul "Jonesy" Jones and Opal Jones with their dog Hugsley (two-time champion).

=== 2016 ===
The winner of the 2016 Best Wave Award was former world champion tandem surfer Chris de Aboitiz with his dogs Rama and Millie.

=== 2017 ===
The winner of the 2017 Best Wave Award was Caitlin Jones with dog Indi.

=== 2018 ===
The winner of the 2018 Best Wave Award was Rob with dog Spike.

=== 2019 ===
The winner of the 2019 Best Wave Award was Chris Oakley with dog Banjo.

=== 2020 ===
The winner of the 2020 Best Wave Award was Paul "Jonesy" Jones, Opal Jones, and Huey Jones with dog Hugsley (three-time champion).

=== 2021 ===
The winner of the 2021 Best Wave Award was Dan Bleicher with dog Pickles.

=== 2022 ===
The winner of the 2022 Best Wave Award was Opal Jones and Lilly Shadforth with first time competitor Freddie.

=== 2023 ===
The winner of the 2023 Best Wave Award was Poppy a Groodle. Best wipe out award went to Rana and special recognition awards went to previous winners and retirees Spike and Hugsley.

=== 2024 ===
The 2024 VetShopAustralia Surfing Dog Championship was held at Noosa First Point at 3:00pm, Saturday 9 March 2024. The winner was staffordshire terrier Bu with owner Dane and the best wipe out award went to kelpie Banjo.

=== 2025 ===
The 2025 VetShopAustralia Surfing Dog Championship was held at Noosa First Point on Saturday 15 March 2025 at 3pm. The winner of the Best Wave Award was red cattle dog Bear and her owner Isaac. The winner of the Best Wipeout was Poppy the poodle and Michelle. The People's Choice award went to corgi Basil who surfed with Cindy.

=== 2026 ===
The 15th VetShopAustralia Surfing Dog Championship was held at First Point, Noosa, Qld, on 14 March 2026. Amazing weather and waves drew a crowd of over 6,000 to watch 12 dogs and their owners shred up the waves. The winner of the Best Wave Award was Loui, the Border Collie and his owner Rodrigo. The winner of the Best Wipeout was Basil the Corgie, surfing with Cindy and the Crowd Favourite award went to Bu, the Blue English Staffy, and her owners Dane and Rio.

== Media ==
The VetShopAustralia Surfing Dog Championships has received extensive television coverage within Australia including being subject of stories on Harry's Practice, Totally Wild and The Today Show and receiving coverage on Channel 7 News, Channel Nine News and ABC Regional News.

== Celebrity judges ==
Judges of the event over the years have included TV Personality Dr Harry Cooper, Pro Surfer Layne Beachley, and Bondi Vet Dr. Alex Hynes.
