= Horse surfing =

Sport involving a horse towing a surfer

Horse surfing is an extreme sport invented in 2004. It requires two people, a horse, and a board. Horse surfing involves one person riding either kite-board, surfboard, wake-board, or skim-board, while being towed behind a horse, ridden by a second person, through shallow water, at speeds up to 40 miles per hour (64 km/h). After originating in England the first official horse surfing competition was held in 2006 in La Baule, France, and over the last 14 years the sport has continued to spread internationally. Today there are several competitions with globally established rules and categories.

== History ==
Horse surfing, a modification of horse boarding, originated in 2005 in Cornwall, England. It was the product of innovation when Daniel Fowler-Prime, the creator of horse boarding, was commissioned for a 'beach trick horse riding' photoshoot. Fowler-Prime forgot to bring a mountain board, his board of choice for horse boarding, to the photoshoot, so he asked local surf shop manager Matt Smith to bring a mountain and wake board to the photoshoot. Smith agreed and horse surfing was first attempted. The popularity of horse surfing has continued to grow ever since. The first horse surfing competition was held in 2006, one year after the sports invention, in La Baule, France. In 2008 the first horse-surfing and horse-boarding drag race was held and the number of competitions has grown ever since with, as of 2020, competitions having been held in Dubai, Australia, Taiwan and the USA.

== Competitions ==
Horse surfing competitions include multiple rides across four different horse surfing disciplines. The competition winner is determined by the total of points accrued over the four events.

=== Competition area ===
The competition area requires a 300m stretch of shallow waterfront, which is divided into two main subareas: (1) the preparation and start zone sub-areas – these areas are designed to give the team a space to connect the horse and rider via the rope and for the horse to take the rope tension so the rider is able to stand and (2) the main course area – this area cannot exceed 250m, but it can be made shorter by moving the finish post closer to the start post where required.

An exact breakdown of the course is as follows-

Pre-competition area

- Preparation zone - 10m

- Start zone - 10m

Start Post- competition area

- The course - maximum length 250m

Finish Post - post competition area

- Run off area - 30m

=== Personnel ===
A horse surfing team is made up of four people and one horse. The two main competitors are the horse rider and the surfer, while the other two team members, the dinghy man and the rope man, are responsible for getting the surfer in place prior to being connected to the horse and connecting the horse to the surfer via the tow rope.

=== Rules and regulations ===
There are several rules that have been standardised across all official horse surfing competitions:

- It is at the discretion of the team if they wish to complete the course right to left or left to right.
- While conditions are comparable for all riders. The decision of the chief judge or event managers' decision is final and cannot be contested. While the contest will continue regardless of weather conditions, in the event of severe and/or rough weather a “severe/rough weather provision” may be issued.
- If a competitor wants to submit a protest it must be done, within 30 minutes of the event in question, in writing. Judges will use official footage to determine the result of protests; no spectator footage will be considered.
- Re-rides will never be granted is reaction to personal equipment fault, however at the judge's decision resides may be allowed in the event of unsafe conditions, rope breakage or other extraneous circumstances.
- Disqualification will result if conduct is considered unsportsmanlike, this includes the use of vulgar language, tantrums, not riding to the best of one's ability, consumption of alcohol during the competition, competing under false pretenses, or concealing significant injuries or health problems.
- There is a risk associated with participating in horse surfing, as such a competitor must sign a participation contract prior to competing, demonstrating they understand the risks associated with horse surfing. All medical conditions or significant/relevant injuries must be disclosed prior to competing.
- While a first aid team is required to be present at all times during federation-sanctioned competitions, and rescue crafts must be ready and waiting in appropriate locations to assist riders who are injured during competing, all competitors are still required to wear a life vest that will be effective in ensuring the competitor floats in the event they become unconscious.

== Equipment ==
Horse riding is a difficult sport meaning proper equipment is essential to success. To successfully horse surf there are four key pieces of equipment.

=== Horse ===
A horse that is comfortable galloping through water to pull the rider at speeds of 35-40 miles per hour is required.

=== Board ===
There are several boards that can be used for horse surfing, including; wake boards, kite boards or skim boards.

==== Wake boards ====
The most important factor when considering which wake board is appropriate is the board size to rider ratio, with larger boards having larger amounts of buoyancy and therefore being better able to support larger riders. The shape of the board also affects how what sort of rider it is appropriate for, a single tip board, with one square and one rounded end, is most appropriate for those who only aim to ride in a straight-line without performing any tricks, while a double tipped board, with two rounded edges allows for more maneuverability in the water, facilitating jumps and tricks. Most wakeboards are made of foam center wrapped in fiberglass or carbon/graphite.

==== Kite boards ====
There are several different types of kite boards that are appropriate for horse surfing, with each having its own advantages and disadvantages. The most common type of kiteboarding is the twin-tip kite board. A kite board is similar in shape to a wake board but can have additional pads and foot straps. Most twin tip models have a base that curves upwards, channels that direct the water in one direction, increasing maximum possible speeds, either straight or curved sides and square or rounded corners. A light wind kite board is the recommended board for heavier riders due to the large surface area created by a flatter, wider more rectangular shape. A kite surfboard is generally used for kite surfers who wish to surf waves and perform tricks involving a large amount of airtime. A kite surfboard is generally smaller, thinner and narrower than a classic surf board and frequently has an epoxy core.

==== Skim boards ====
As with wake boards, skim boards come in a range of sizes and thicknesses, each with advantages and disadvantages. Thicker boards are more buoyant, gliding on top of the water, allowing for easier balance, while thinner boards are more sensitive to riders' weight changes, allowing for higher speeds and more intricate trick. The type of material used to craft the skim board also affects the style in which it can be ridden, with carbon fiber boards most commonly used by professionals, foam boards most suited to beginners and wooden boards being used by inland riders due to their weight.

=== Modified saddle and tow rope ===
A custom made saddle that allows for secure connection of a tow rope, as well as a tow rope strong enough to withstand the tension of the rider will be required to horse surf.

== Locations ==
Horse surfing is possible in any river, lake, or ocean that is shallow enough for a horse to gallop through while deep enough to allow a rider to be buoyant enough to surf. As horse riding is not permitted or may require a permit in some areas it is important to check rules and regulations before choosing a location. Horse riding on busy beaches is not recommended as people, balls, surf boards, frisbees, dogs, and any other moving objects may spook the horse, resulting in a lack of control and possible injury.

Horses hooves have the potential to do damage to the beach ecosystem. Riders can minimise this damage by staying away from beach dunes, wildlife sanctuary zones, turtle nesting sites and not riding through flocks of birds or near marine life.

For competition training a 300m straight stretch of water and sand will be necessary. As of the start of 2020, horse-surfing competitions have been recorded as taking place in Taiwan, Australia, Dubai and the USA.

== Beach horse riding special considerations ==
For the purpose of Beach riding, special training of both the horse and rider is required. A pre-requisite is that the horse should be well practiced in beach riding, else it may become spooked or anxious. The experience of each horse while entering the water will be unique. Therefore, it is quite important for safety of the horse and rider that the horce is not forced into the water. Another option can be to have a second rider and horse. The ones who are practiced in beach riding. They will help the horse stay calm and make the training process safer.

Riding on beach sand requires more strength than riding on harder surfaces such as natural trails or race tracks. To reduce the chance of soft-tissue injury or muscle soreness it is best, while the horse is building up their beach fitness, to ride the horse along the firmer sand at the waters edge, take a slower pace, and take rest breaks.

After riding on the beach the horse will need to be properly cleaned to avoid any damage from the exposure to salt water and sand. It is important to rinse the horse all over with clean fresh water to remove any salt that might dry out their skin, and carefully check for any scrapes of cuts. Ocean water can contain infectious microbes so if the horse has been cut or scratched the wounds should be thoroughly cleaned and treated with antibiotics. Sand can be very damaging to horse hoof tissue if they are unshod, hooves will need to be careful checked and cleaned after beach riding to remove all sand. If the horse wears pads it is recommended a space be cut in the middle of the pad, so that sand does not build up.

== See also ==
- Dog surfing – involves dogs that are trained to surf on surfboards, bodyboards, skimboards, windsurf boards or to bodysurf
