= Kai Lenny =

American waterman

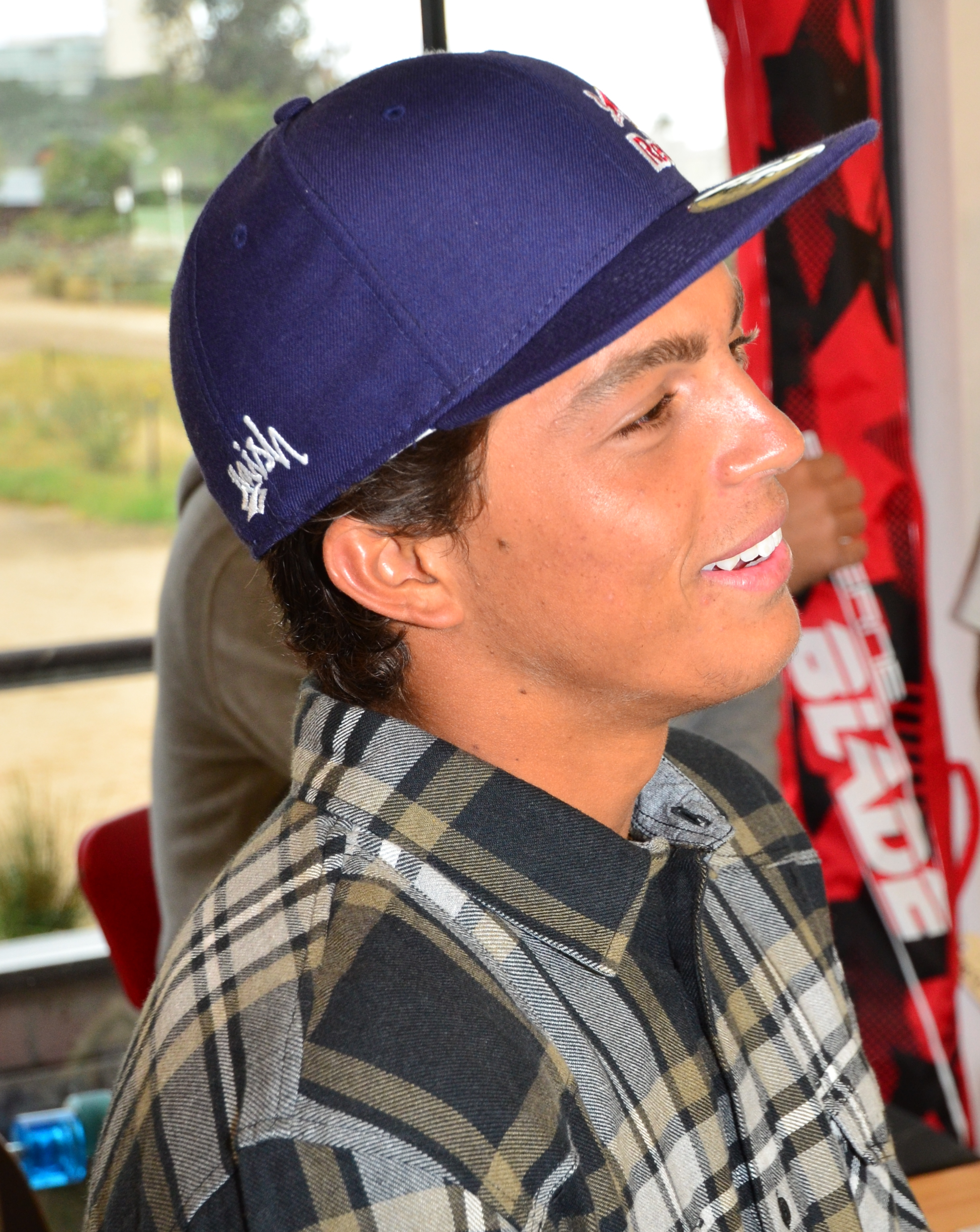
- Lenny in 2012

Personal information
- Born: October 8, 1992 (age 33) Pāʻia, Hawaii

Surfing career
- Sport: Surfing
- Best year: 2012
- Sponsors: Red Bull, Nike, Hurley, Oakley, GoPro, TAG Heuer, Cariuma
- Major achievements: 2013 SUP Race World Champion, 2013 Sup Wave World Champion, 2013 SUP Overall World Champion, 2013 Vice KSP Kiting World Champion, 2012 World SUP Race Champion, 2012 Hawaii Island Finals SUP pro Winner, Sunset Beach SUP pro Winner

Surfing specifications
- Stance: Regular
- Quiver: KT SUP, 4.7 Goya Sails, Quatro Boards, Keith Teboul Custom Boards

Kai Lenny (born October 8, 1992) is an American professional surfer. He is known for big wave surfing, but has competed in a number of other disciplines, including windsurfing, kitesurfing, and standup paddleboarding (SUP). Lenny lives on Maui, and is often associated with the waves at Pe’ahi. He is considered one of the best and most versatile surfers in the world.

== Career ==
Lenny was born on Maui, to parents who had moved to Pāʻia from the mainland. His parents were windsurfers, and he picked up that watersport at age six and kitesurfing by age nine, after starting to surf by age five. He received his first sponsorship at age ten, and became a Red Bull athlete at age 13 following a kitesurfing competition.

In 2009, Lenny was named the windsurfing rookie of the year.

Lenny achieved recognition in SUP in 2012 with first place at the Hawaii Island Finals SUP Pro, and first place at the Sunset Beach SUP Pro. Kai Lenny claimed the SUP Racing World Title when he won the season finals of the first Standup World Series championship races held on O'ahu in September 2012. He would win eight SUP world titles, making him the most successful athlete in the sport.

In February 2020 Lenny won the Nazaré Tow Surfing Challenge, at Praia do Norte, in Portugal. The contest ran in massive waves and included the participation of the best big wave riders in the world.

In 2019, he became the youngest person to be inducted into the Surfer's Hall of Fame.

== Personal life ==
Lenny is married to Maui-based interior designer Molly Payne. The couple have three kids.

In May 2021, Lenny established the nonprofit Positively Kai Foundation. Lenny appeared in Tulsi Gabbard's video of her 2023 visit to Maui after the fires.
