= Bonga Perkins =

American surfer

Personal information
- Born: Oahu, Hawaii

Surfing career
- Years active: 17 years
- Best year: Ranked 1st on the ASP World Tour, 1996 and 2009
- Major achievements: ASP World Champion in 1996 and 2009

Gregory 'Bonga' Perkins (born 1972 in Oahu, Hawaii and raised in Honolulu.) is an American professional longboard surfrider and two-time ASP World Longboard Champion.

Perkins won his first ASP World Longboard Championship title in 1996, defeating Alex Salazar (Brazil) in the final. In 2008, he reclaimed the world title by beating France's Antoine Delpero in the final at San Clemente, California. He finished as a runner up three times in 1994, 1997 and 2002. He also finished third in the ASP World Tour on six occasions in 1995, 1997, 2003, 2004, 2007 and 2009.
