= Justine Dupont =

French professional surfer

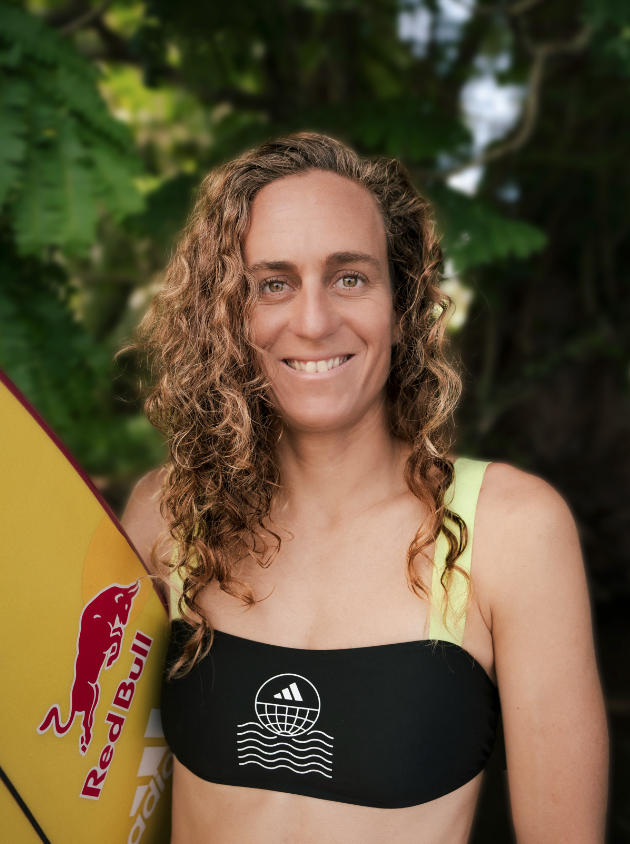

Personal information
- Born: 27 July 1991 (age 34) Bordeaux, France
- Website: justinedupont.fr

Surfing career
- Sport: Surfing
- Sponsors: Red Bull, Adidas, Manera, Breitling
- Major achievements: 12 times World Champion of the XXL Awards; 3 times World Champion of tow Surfing; 2019 World Champion Stand Up Paddle; 4 times 2nd place World Champion

Surfing specifications
- Stance: Regular

Justine Dupont (born 27 August 1991) is a French professional surfer and champion in several disciplines. She holds the record for the 2nd largest measured wave ever surfed by a woman, at 70.5 ft (21.5 m), in February, 2020, at Nazaré, Portugal. She is a 12 times World Champion of the XXL Awards, three times World Champion of Tow Surfing, four times World Champion 2nd place, and 2019 Stand Up Paddle World Champion. Her performance in tow-in surfing ranks her with some of the best male surfers in the discipline. In 2025 she placed second among men in the Nazaré Big Waves Challenge.

== Career ==
Justine Dupont was born in Bordeaux, France. She began surfing at the age of 11.

She was the French national longboard champion at the age of 15. In 2007 at the age of 16 she was 2nd in the World Longboard Championships.

In 2013, Dupont became the first woman to surf the 15m Belharra in the Northern Basque Country of France.

In 2016, she was 2nd in the Big Waves World Championship.

In 2017, she was crowned ISA World Team Surfing Champion with the French team.

Dupont has also won multiple National and European surfing and longboarding championships. She has accumulated three ISA World Team Titles with France (2013 and 2019 Longboard, 2017 Surf).

She has repeatedly surfed waves considered as some of the biggest waves in the world by a woman. She holds the record for the second largest wave ever surfed by a woman, at 70.5 ft (21.5 m), on February 11, 2020, at Nazaré, Portugal, behind Brazilian surfer Maya Gabeira, 73.5 ft (22.4 m), on the same day, also at Nazaré.

In 2019, she won two trophies at the XXL Big Waves Awards.

Justine was elected Chair of the ISA Athletes' Commission for the 2020 Olympic Games.

In February 2020, she won the first-ever Nazaré Tow Challenge.

In January 2023 she surfed a gigantic wave at Cortes Bank, 110 miles off the coast of California. The wave is being measured as a potential World Record for the biggest wave surfed by a woman.

In 2023, she was one of the first women to be invited to compete in The Eddie Aikau Invitational competition in Hawaii.

In 2025, she won the Nazaré Big Wave Challenge and placed second among the men

== Surfing career highlights ==
- 2025
  - Winner of WSL Nazaré Tow Challenge
  - Second of WSL Nazaré Tow Challenge in the men division
- 2024
  - Participation in the Eddie Aikau Invitational
- 2023
  - SIMA Waterperson of the Year
  - Nominated at the Laureus World Sports Awards for World Action Sportsperson of the YearWomen
  - Ride Of The Year Award
  - Women Biggest Wave Of The Year Award
  - Women Performance Of The Year Award
  - ISA Stand Up Paddle Team World Champion
  - ISA Stand Up Paddle World Championships 4th place
  - Winner of Safi Surf Invitational, Morocco
- 2022
  - Women XXL Ride of the Year Award
  - Women XXL Biggest Wave of the Year Award
- 2021
  - Winner of WSL Nazaré Tow Challenge
  - Women XXL Performance of the Year Award
  - Women XXL Ride of the Year Award
  - Women XXL Biggest Wave of the Year Award
  - Women Performance of the Year at Mavericks Awards
- 2020
  - Women XXL Performance of the Year Award
  - Women XXL Ride of the Year Award
  - Winner of the WSL Nazaré Tow Challenge
- 2019
  - ISA Stand Up Paddle World Champion
  - ISA Stand Up Paddle Team World Champion
  - Women XXL Performance of the Year Award
  - Women XXL Biggest Wave Award
  - ISA Longboard World Championship: 2nd individual
  - ISA Longboard World Championship: 1st team
  - Elected European surfer of the year by Eurosima
  - Heavy Water Award by Surfer Mag
- 2018
  - European Longboard Champion
  - Jaws Challenge: 5th
  - QS Caparica, Portugal: 1st
  - LQS Espinho, Portugal: 1st
  - LQS Caparica, Portugal: 2nd
  - LQS Biarritz, France: 2nd
- 2017
  - ISA surf team World Champion
  - Aloha Cup World Champion with French team
  - ISA Stand Up Paddle Surfing World Championship: 2nd
  - ISA Stand Up Paddle World Championship with French team: 2nd
  - Stand Up Paddle team European Champion
  - European Stand Up Paddle Surfing Championships: 2nd
  - LQS Boardmasters Jeep Women's Longboard: 1st
  - WQS 1000 Caparica Pro, Portugal: 1st
  - Women's Pe'ahi Challenge: 3rd
- 2016
  - WSL Big Waves World Championships, Pea'hi, Hawaii: 2nd
  - WQS 1000 Central Coast Pro, Avoca Beach, Australia: 1st
  - WQS 1500 Azores Airlines Pro, Açores, Portugal: 1st
- 2015
  - National surf Champion
  - National longboard Champion
- 2014
  - European Longboard Champion
  - LQS Vieux Boucau Longboard festival, France: 1st
- 2013
  - World longboard championships, China: 3rd
  - World longboard ISA team Champion with France, Peru
  - World longboard ISA championships, Peru: 3rd
- 2012
  - WQS 6000 Surf Pro Estoril, Cascais, Portugal: 1st
- 2011
  - European Surf Champion
- 2010
  - World longboard ISA championships, Biarritz, France: 3rd
  - National surf Champion
  - National longboard Champion
- 2009
  - World longboard ISA championships, Biarritz, France: 3rd
- 2008
  - European Surf Champion
  - National longboard Champion
- 2007
  - World longboard championships, Biarritz, France: 2nd
  - National longboard Champion
- 2006
  - National longboard Champion

== Personal life ==
Dupont was a commentator on French TV during the 2021 Olympics.

She is one of the main characters in the HBO series "100 Foot Wave".

She lives between the South West of France and Nazaré, Portugal. She has a child.
