= Joel Tudor =

American surfer (born 1976)

Personal information
- Born: 11 June 1976 (age 50) San Diego, California, U.S.
- Weight: 65.9 kg (145 lb)
- Website: joeltudor.com

Surfing career
- Sport: Surfing
- Best year: Ranked 1st - 1998, 2004, 2021 WSL World Tour Ranking
- Sponsors: Kookboxx, Sector 9, Vans, Matuse
- Major achievements: 3x WSL Longboard World Champion (1998, 2004, 2021); 8x US open Champion; 5x US Champion

Surfing specifications
- Stance: Goofy
- Shaper: Donald Takayama, THC Surfboards
- Favorite waves: Cardiff by the Sea, Pipeline
- Favorite maneuvers: Hang 10, Barrels

Joel Tudor is an American surfer, primarily known for longboarding, and a competitive grappler from San Diego, California.

== Biography ==
=== Professional Surf career ===
Tudor became a professional surfer at 14 and won his first professional ASP competition at age 15, making him the youngest competitor to win an ASP event.

He rode a longboard, and in 1998 he won his first ASP Longboard World Championship in the Canary Islands. He won the U.S. Open of Longboarding 8 times, and won the ASP Longboard World Championship for the second time in 2004. In 2021 Tudor won his third world title at 45 years old.

=== Grappling ===
Tudor is also a Brazilian jiu-jitsu Black Belt under Carlson Gracie Black Belt and World Champion, Rodrigo Medeiros / BJJ Revolution Team. He is also an ADCC veteran.

== Other projects ==
In 2010, he founded the international Longboard Competition called the Duct Tape Invitational.

=== Publications ===
During 1999 to 2004 Tudor collaborated with photographer Michael Halsband to create Surf Book, a homage to the architects of contemporary surf culture. Tudor's text accompanied Halsband's photographs. The book was designed by Doug Lloyd and edited by Scott Hulet. Additional text was written by C.R. Stecyk.

=== Documentaries ===
Tudor is featured in the art film "Surf Movie: reels 1- 14" shot in 8mm by Michael Halsband, "Shelter" a 16mm film by Chris Malloy, "The Seedling", "Sprout", "The Present" 16mm surfing films by Thomas Campbell, the super 16mm film, "One California Day" by Jason Baffa and Mark Jeremias, and "Kingshighway - Rob Machado and Joel Tudor" by Paulo Carvalho (Kid Rio) and Danny Camp.

=== Family ===
Tudor has two children: Tosh and Juda Tudor.
