= Tom Blake (surfer) =

American surfer and inventor (1902–1994)

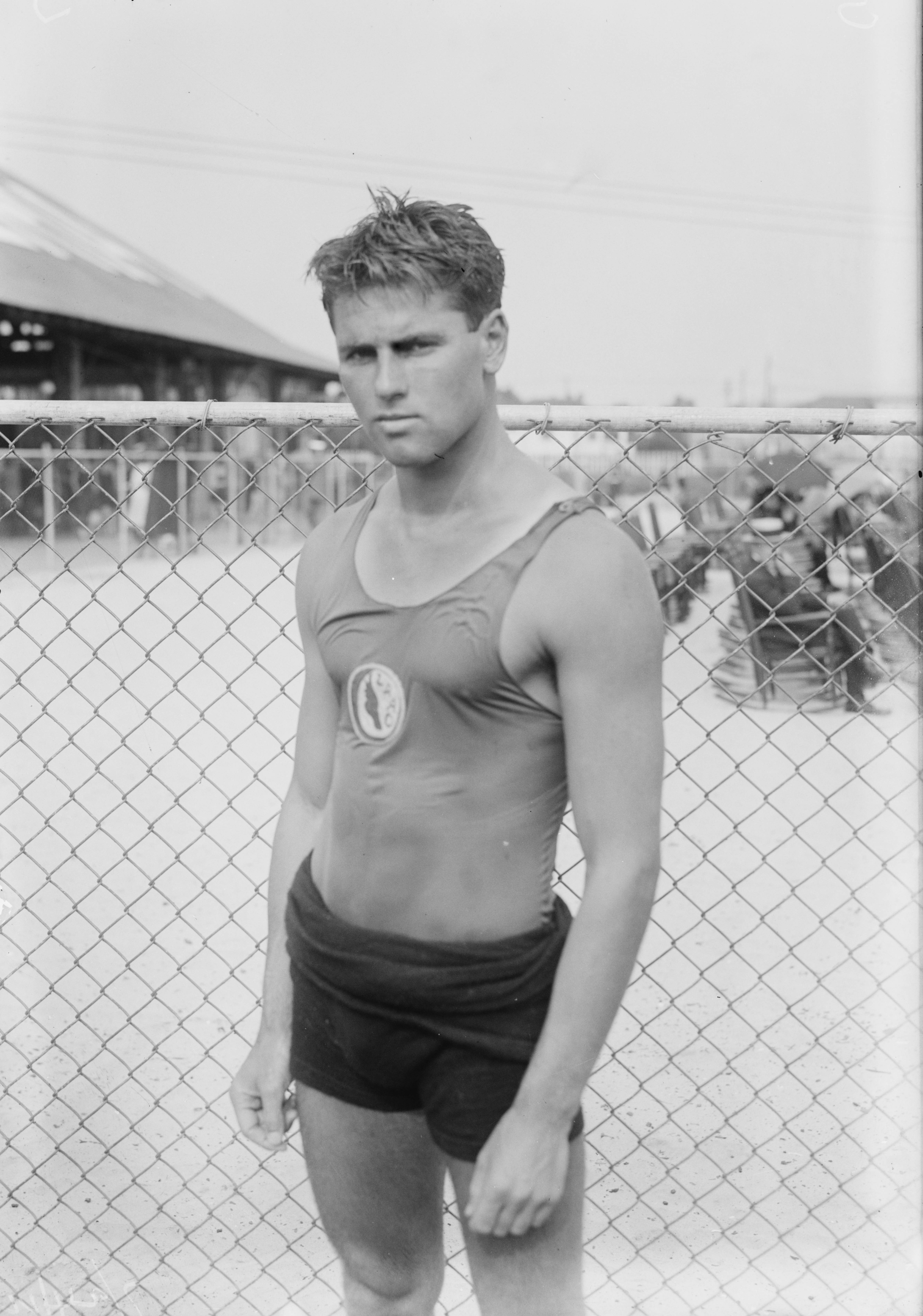
- Born: Thomas Edward Blake; March 8, 1902; Milwaukee, Wisconsin, U.S.
- Died: May 5, 1994 (aged 92); Ashland, Wisconsin, U.S.
- Occupations: Surfer, lifeguard
- Known for: Popularizing surfing
- Notable work: Innovations in surfboard design

Thomas Edward Blake (March 8, 1902 – May 5, 1994) was an American athlete, inventor, and writer, widely considered to be one of the most influential surfers in history, and a key figure in transforming surfing from a regional Hawaiian specialty to a nationally popular sport. Assessing Blake's significance, sociologist Kristin Lawler wrote that

Tom Blake is a legendary figure; he's considered the founder of California surf culture. He personally innovated most of what's associated with surfers to this day: he was the first to experiment with making better surfboards, revolutionizing board design in the process with lightweight materials and the fin; he was the first to build a waterproof camera housing and inaugurated the tradition of surfers documenting themselves and their friends; and he was the first among countless surfers to come to write a book on the history and pleasures of surfing. In addition, his personal style became the prototypical beachcomber look, still in effect today.

== Early life ==
Blake was born in Milwaukee, Wisconsin. His mother died of tuberculosis when he was eleven months old, and his father left him in the care of relatives in Hibbing, Minnesota; Ashland, Wisconsin; and finally Washburn, Wisconsin on the Lake Superior shore, where he spent most of his childhood. He attended Washburn's St. Louis Catholic School, where, he later recalled, an educational film provided his first awareness of surfing.

Blake attended Washburn High School, but the 1918 influenza pandemic closed the school during his senior year, and local records are inconclusive as to whether he graduated. After leaving school, Blake embarked upon the nomadic lifestyle that would characterize most of his life, working a succession of jobs in Detroit, New York, and Miami. One episode from that period that presaged his later career occurred in Detroit in 1920, when he encountered the legendary Hawaiian surfer Duke Kahanamoku at a movie theater. He shook hands with Kahanamoku and later reported, "I felt that somehow he had included an invitation to me to come over to his own Hawaiian islands... As I look back now I realize how much I was influenced by this first contact with the man who has become the best-known personality in the history of surfing." Blake and Kahanamoku later became good friends.

By 1921, Blake was living in Santa Monica, California, where he supported himself as a lifeguard and occasionally worked as a stuntman in films. Over the years he served as stunt double for stars such as Ramon Navarro and Clark Gable. During this period he became active in competitive swimming. In 1922, he traveled to Pennsylvania to enter a ten-mile race on the Delaware River and triumphed over a field of the East Coast's top swimmers, breaking the existing record in the process.

== Surfing and surfboards ==
Blake first attempted to ride a wave in 1921 on an old board he found while working at the Santa Monica Swim Club. According to his account, he wiped out badly and waited several years to try again. By 1924, however, his interest returned, to the point that he traveled to Hawaii to learn more about the sport. Upon arrival, Blake attempted to seek out Kahanamoku, only to find that he was not on the island. However, he quickly became friends with Duke's five brothers, all skilled surfers in their own right, and became immersed in the study of surfing and Hawaiian culture. For the next thirty years, Blake would divide his time between Hawaii and the mainland, shuttling back and forth every year except when interrupted by the Second World War.

Over the next decade, Blake rose to eminence in a sport that had until then been largely the province of native Hawaiians. Back on the mainland, in September 1927, Blake and his friend Sam Reid became the first to surf Malibu Point, and in 1928, he organized, and then won, the first Pacific Coast Surfriding Championship. In 1930, he entered the Hawaiian Surfboard Paddling Championships using a lightweight board of his own design. He overwhelmed all opposition, setting eight new records in the course of the match. However, his victory sparked some resentment among his native Hawaiian friends, feeling that the new board had given him unfair advantage, and Blake stopped entering races after this. Nonetheless, he continued to compile an extraordinary record of athletic feats. In 1932, Blake, with two friends, made the first successful attempt at paddling the 26 miles from mainland California to Catalina Island. Then on August 1, 1936, he set a milestone that still stands: entering the waves at Kalehuawehe near Waikiki, he made a run estimated at 4,500 feet, the longest recorded surf ride in history.

While in Hawaii, Blake became fascinated by the traditional surfboards preserved at the Bernice Pauahi Bishop Museum in Honolulu. These included a variety of styles, from the shorter alaia to the heavy, 16-foot long olo boards traditionally reserved for royalty including one owned by High Chief Abner Pākī. On his 1926 visit, he was able to secure permission from the curators to study the boards' construction and restore several of them. He then began his own experiments in improving surfboard design. Up until that point, most modern surfers, even Duke Kahanamoku, used the shorter alaia boards due to the immense weight— up to 200 pounds— of the solid olo boards. Blake initially sought to build lighter olos by drilling hundreds of holes in the board, then covering the openings with a thin outer layer. This was the style of board he used to win the 1928 Pacific Coast Championship. Then after three years of experimenting, in 1929, Blake constructed a hollow board with transverse bracing. In 1932, he received a patent for his hollow surfboard design "and opened the sport up to hundreds of people who weren't able to muscle the heavy plank boards down the beach and into the water."

One historian remarked: "Blake changed the whole scene by working on these boards. He single-handedly, without really giving it much thought, changed surfing in a massive, huge way. It was because of this we are doing what we do on boards."

Blake's internally braced hollow wooden surfboards were eventually superseded by laminated boards with an interior layer of balsa, then by foam-and-fiberglass designs, but another of his innovations remains a fixture of modern surf- and paddleboards, the "skeg" or fin. Traditional surfboards were flat-bottomed, but in 1935, Blake experimented by tearing the keel off an old speedboat and attaching it to the bottom of a surfboard. Blake later remembered, "I finally put the fin on the board and went out in the surf, paddled out. In paddling out, the board had an entirely different feeling with the skeg on it, it wasn't entirely a likeable feeling... But I got a pretty good wave and right away found the remarkable control you had over the board with the skeg on it. It didn't spin out, it steered easy, because the tail held steady when you put the pressure on the front. You could turn it any way you wanted it. I knew right from that moment it was a success. I consider it as my good solid contribution to the sport. It gives me a lot of pleasure when I see the kids drive by in their cars with a fin on their board."

(According to at least one source, the San Diego surfer Woody Brown independently came up with the idea for the skeg shortly afterward, but Brown himself gave Blake precedence: “(I made my first surfboard keel) about '36 or '37, somewhere in there; about the same time. But, I didn't know anything about (Blake) and his experiments with adding fins to surfboards. See, we were all separated out. I was in San Diego and he was in L.A., way up there.")

== Other inventions ==
Blake's inventions and innovations were not limited to surfboards. He was particularly interested in improving lifesaving equipment, and he adapted his hollow surfboard designs into paddleboards for rescue use. He built the first aluminum “torpedo” rescue buoy, basing it on the steel buoy created by California lifeguard Harry Walters in 1919. His contributions to the field of water rescue were recognized by the National Surf Life Saving Association, which presented Blake with an achievement award noting, “the thousands of lives saved because of his inventive contributions in the interest of fellow human beings."

In the early 1930s, Blake experimented with the idea of attaching a sail to one of his surfboards. As one author wrote, "The modern sport of windsurfing can be traced back to the 1930s when a surfer named Tom Blake, whose arms became particularly tired one afternoon from paddling his board out to catch the waves, thought he should be able to use the wind for propulsion.” For his first experiment, he simply used an umbrella, but subsequently refined the design, adding a proper sail and a foot-controlled rudder. By 1935, he had a version usable in competitions, and in 1940, the L.A. Ladder Company produced them for sale.

Blake also contributed substantially to the field of underwater photography. In 1929, he purchased a Graflex camera from Duke Kahanamoku, then built a waterproof housing that allowed him to take photographs underwater or while surfing. Although it is often stated that Blake "built the first underwater camera," in fact, there had been sporadic attempts to do so since as early as 1856. Nonetheless, Blake's innovations were significant, and a photo spread of his work that was published in 1935 in National Geographic magazine helped call attention to the potential his device offered.

An indication of the significance of Blake's work came in 2025, when he was inducted into the National Inventor's Hall of Fame for his numerous contributions to the sports of surfing, paddle boarding, and windsurfing, and to his achievements in the field of water rescue.

== Writing ==
In addition to the 1935 National Geographic photo-essay mentioned above ("Waves and Thrills at Waikiki"), in the same year Blake also published what is said to be the first book on surfing, Hawaiian Surfboard, a comprehensive study which treated the history and tradition of the sport, board construction, and surfing technique. He also wrote articles on surfboard construction for Popular Mechanics (1936) and Popular Science (1939). In 1961 he published his second book, Hawaiian Surf Riding.

Later in life, Blake devoted a great deal of his thought to matters of philosophy, and in 1969, published an essay, "Voice of the Wave," which approached surfing from a metaphysical perspective. He then revised and greatly expanded this essay into a book, Voice of the Atom, completed in 1982. Offering acknowledgments to "Descartes, Marcus Aurelius, Epictetus, Socrates, Aristotle, Gautama, Lao Tsu, Confucius, Zeno, Mohammed;... Swedenborg, Spinoza, Emerson, Thoreau, Bacon, Schweitzer, Galileo, Copernicus, Albert Einstein" and many others, the book explored topics as diverse as immortality, vegetarianism, and the nature of God. Much of the work is presented as a conversation with a young man named "Anthony," a mysterious hitch-hiker. It is clear that the book is the culmination of a long process of contemplation: some eighteen years before its publication, he carved its essential message, “NATURE=GOD”, into a secluded rock face on the Lake Superior shoreline near his hometown of Washburn.

== Later life ==
Blake maintained a nomadic existence for nearly all the remainder of his long life. With the exception of the wartime era, he traveled back and forth from the mainland to Hawaii every year until the mid-1950s. While in Hawaii, he usually lived in a beach shack or aboard a boat; on the mainland he often lived out of his car. He typically supported himself by working as a lifeguard, an occupation he pursued into his early sixties.

In 1925, Blake married 18-year-old Frances Cunningham, daughter of an affluent Hollywood family. His new in-laws attempted to arrange a job for him at a ranch in Oklahoma, but that did not work out. The marriage did not last a year, and Blake remained single ever after.

When the Second World War broke out, Blake enlisted in the U.S. Coast Guard. Considerably older than the average enlisted man, he served three years, teaching swimming and ocean rescue, and serving on a munitions loading team.

Blake admitted to feeling the advance of age as he entered his fifties. A crucial incident took place in 1952 at Makaha Beach on the western shore of Oahu. Knocked off his board, he could not recover properly and came close to passing out. A companion came to his aid and Blake accepted a ride back to shore, without his board, which eventually washed up on shore, badly nicked. Blake later commented, "For the first time in my life, I realized I was getting old... That was the beginning of the end."

Three years later, Blake made a sharp break with his previous life. In September 1955, deciding that Hawaii had become too crowded and changed for the worse since his halcyon days, he left the island for good. For the next three decades, from 1955 well into the 1980s, Blake lived wherever the mood took him: in California at Malibu, Ventura, and in the Imperial Valley on the shore of the Salton Sea; in Florida, at Boca Raton; and finally back to Wisconsin. He lived in his vehicles – vans and station wagons – setting up camp and then moving on. His friend and biographer Gary Lynch reported that in those days, Blake owned one plate, one knife, one fork, one dish, and one chair.

In 1967, Blake returned to his hometown of Washburn for the first time in 43 years. He quickly renewed his ties to the community, spending much of his remaining years living in his van at a park on the Lake Superior shoreline, where he was seen as a friendly eccentric who was more than happy to give swimming and paddling lessons to local teenagers.

No discussion of Blake's life would be complete without mention of his long-term commitment to vegetarianism, a philosophy that he adopted with evangelical zeal. In a 1955 article reporting Blake's departure from the island, the Honolulu Star-Bulletin reminisced about the sight of the great surfer as, "Late in the evening... he would seek his way back to (his) tiny boat, carrying a brown paper sack containing carrots, celery, a loaf of bread, some cheese (and) ice cream for his lonely evening meal." A 1989 article explains: “Blake states: ‘I knew I didn't want to be killed, and I figured all animals felt the same way.’”

Blake finally gave up his wandering ways in 1986, at the age of 84. He spent his last years living in an apartment in Ashland, Wisconsin, about one-quarter mile from Lake Superior. He died on May 5, 1994, and is buried in Washburn’s Woodland Cemetery under a simple stone that notes his Coast Guard service but says nothing of his other achievements.

== Influence ==
Tom Blake is widely described as one of the most significant figures in the history of surfing: for his athletic achievements, for his innovations in board design, for his success in popularizing the sport, and for his role in pioneering what came to be known as “the surfing life.” In 2001, surf journalist Drew Kampion wrote, "Blake altered everything. He almost single-handedly transformed surfing from a primitive Polynesian curiosity into a 20th-century lifestyle."

Blake's biographer Gary Lynch described his significance this way: "Tom Blake is the obvious link between the ancient South Pacific waterman and the twentieth century Anglo waterman. Not only did he precede most other Anglo visitors to Hawaii that surfed, he understood and adopted the Aloha frame-of-mind and possessed the unique ability to produce water craft in harmony with the previous one thousand years of surfing's progression. Blake placed surfboards, paddleboards, and life saving equipment within reach of the interested athlete, lifeguard, and seaside visitor. In Blake's life, there was no separation between religion, surfing, swimming, building surfboards, eating, and exercise. At the time, no one guessed that his unorthodox life style would one day become the accepted standard for the beach culture.”

In 1991, writing in Surfer magazine, Sam George summed up Blake's accomplishments: "To put it simply, because Tom Blake was, we are. The extraordinary contributions of this one man to the lifestyle we call surfing are almost impossible to gauge. They're too broad, too all-encompassing. Thomas Edward Blake's initials are at the root of so many innovations and influences as almost to be taken for granted. A dozen or so men might have eventually done everything Blake did singularly. Even a partial list of his accomplishments is overwhelming. His greatest contribution was a life – our life. Tom Blake didn't just surf, but made a life of surfing. And while the great Duke nobly represented a spiritual tie to his ancient Hawaiian sport, it was Blake who provided the modern mode for all who came after. And now here we are at the end of the century – a century of surfing he shaped more than anyone – we still look like him, we still dress like him, we still surf like him."

== See also ==
- List of members of the International Swimming Hall of Fame

== Bibliography ==
- Blake, Tom (1935) Hawaiian Surfboard. (Republished 1983 as Hawaiian Surf Riders, Mountain and Sea Publishing, Redondo Beach, Cal.)
- Blake, Tom (1982) Voice of the Atom. priv. pub.
- Gault-Williams, Malcolm (2003) “Woody 'Spider' Brown” Legendary Surfers: A Definitive History of Surfing's Culture and Heroes, Volume 1, Chapter 24 (Originally: “Woody Brown: Pilot, Surfer, Sailor,” The Surfer's Journal, V:3, Fall 1996.)
- Klein, Arthur (1965) Surfing. J.B. Lippincott and Co.
- Lawler, Kristin (2010) Radical: The Image of the Surfer and the Politics of Popular Culture. Routledge and Keegan Paul.
- Lueras, Leonard (1984) Surfing, The Ultimate Pleasure. Workman Publishing. ISBN 978-0-89480-749-7.
- Lynch, Gary (2001) Tom Blake : The Uncommon Journey Of A Pioneer Waterman. Croul Family Foundation, Corona del Mar, Cal. ISBN 978-0-9704228-0-4.
- Lynch, Gary (November 1989) “Beyond the Horizon” Surfer, XXX:11.
- Woiak, Tony (1994) Small Town, U.S.A: Washburn, Wisconsin. F.A. Weber & Sons
- Yehling, Bob (November 1981) “Tom Blake- Voice of the Atom” Surfer, XXII:11, pp 64–68.
