= Schweitzer (disambiguation) =

Schweitzer is a surname.

Schweitzer may also refer to:

- Schweitzer Mountain Resort, a ski resort in Idaho
- Hôpital Albert Schweitzer – a hospital in Gabon
- Schweitzer Engineering Laboratories, a power systems protection company
- Schweitzer cabinet, German state government
- Schweitzer (film)

== See also ==
- Schweizer (disambiguation)
