= Sweitzer (surname) =

Sweitzer is an ethnonymic surname, an Americanized form of the German and Yiddish surname Schweitzer literally meaning "Swiss person". Notable people with the surname include:

- J. Russell Sweitzer (1890–1988), American politician
- Jacob B. Sweitzer (1821–1881), Pennsylvania lawyer and soldier
- Morgan Sweitzer (1891–1953), Colorado fruit cultivator
- Sandi Sweitzer (born 1946), American former figure skater
- Robert Sweitzer (1868–1938), American politician

== See also ==
- Switzer (surname)
- Schweitzer
- Schweizer
- Schwyzer
