= Sweitzer Lake =

Sweitzer Lake may refer to:

- Sweitzer Lake State Park, a state park in Colorado
- Sweitzer Lake (Minnesota), a lake in Minnesota
