= History of surfing =

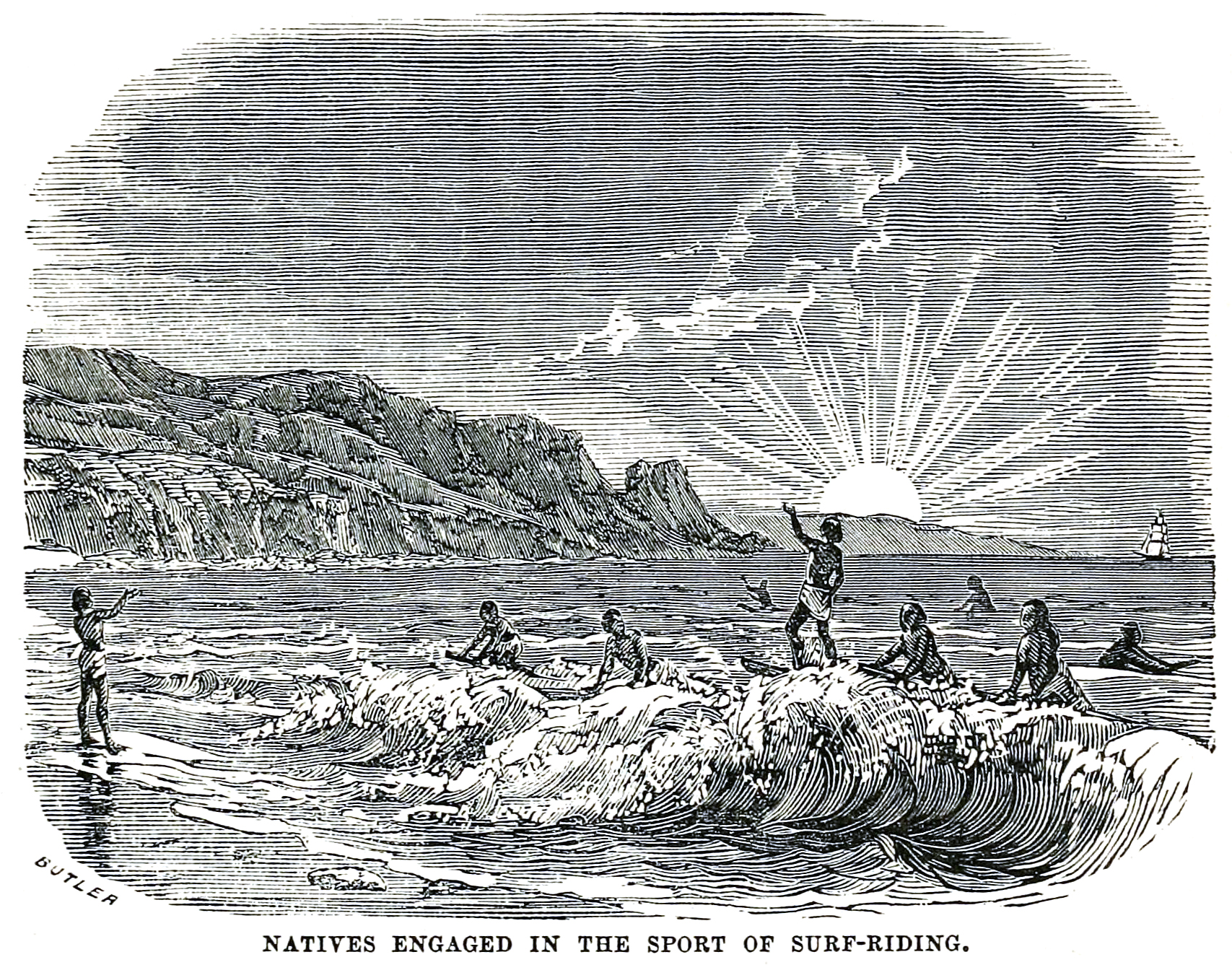
1858 illustration of "surf-riding" in Hawaii.

The riding of waves has likely existed since humans began swimming in the ocean. In this sense, bodysurfing is the oldest type of wave-catching. Undoubtedly ancient sailors learned how to ride wave energy on many styles of early boats. However, standing up on what is now called a surfboard is a relatively recent innovation developed by the Polynesians. The influences for modern surfing can be directly traced to the surfers of pre-contact Hawaii.

== Peru ==
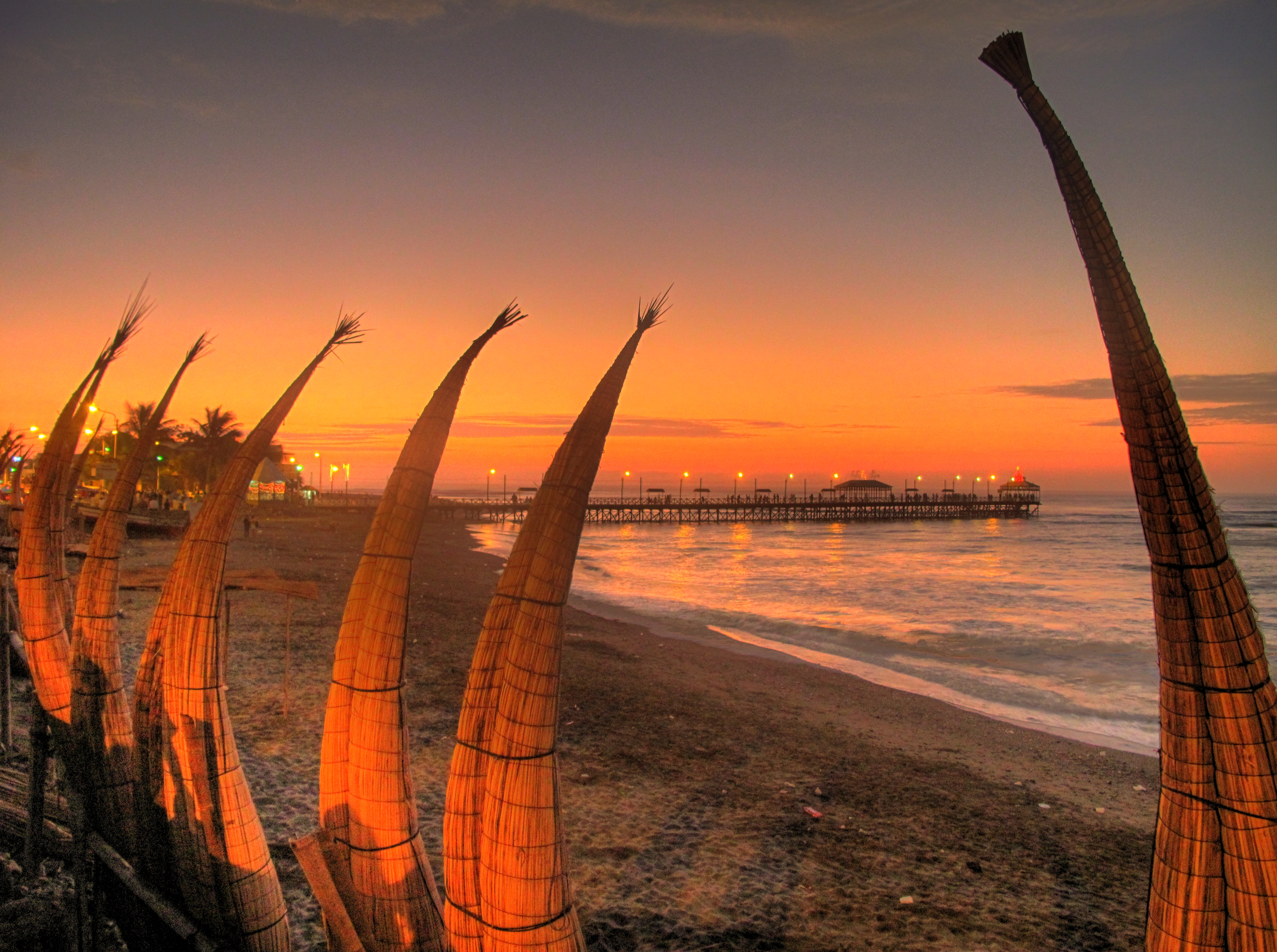
Caballito de totora

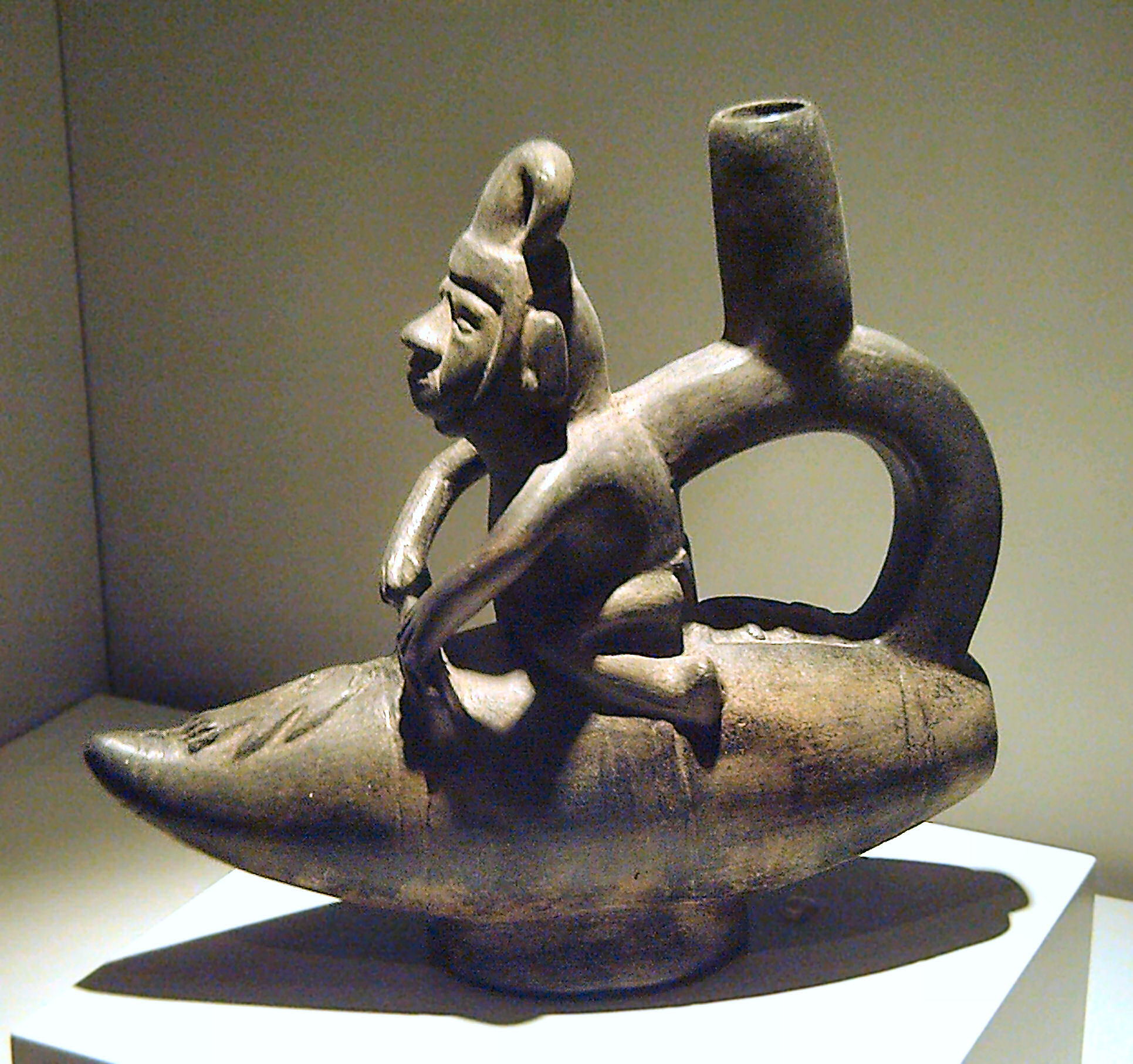
Chimú vessel representing a fisherman on a caballito de totora (1100–1400 CE)

Archaeologists have found that the practice of riding a vessel with a wave was utilized since the pre-Inca cultures around three to five thousand years ago. The Moche culture used the caballito de totora (little horse of totora), a type of reed found in the lagoons of northern Peru, with archaeological evidence showing its use around 200 CE.

An early description of the Inca surfing was documented by Jesuit missionary José de Acosta in his 1590 publication Historia natural y moral de las Indias, writing:

It is true to see them go fishing in Callao de Lima, was for me a thing of great recreation, because there were many and each one in a balsilla caballero, or sitting stubbornly cutting the waves of the sea, which is rough where they fish, they looked like the Tritons, or Neptunes, who paint upon the water.

To this day Caballitos de Totora are still used by local fishermen and can also be ridden by tourists for recreational purposes.

== West Africa ==
West Africans (e.g., Ghana, Ivory Coast, Liberia, Senegal) and western Central Africans (e.g., Cameroon) independently developed the skill of surfing. Amid the 1640s CE, Michael Hemmersam provided an account of surfing in the Gold Coast: “the parents ‘tie their children to boards and throw them into the water.’” In 1679 CE, Barbot provided an account of surfing among Elmina children in Ghana: “children at Elmina learned “to swim, on bits of boards, or small bundles of rushes, fasten’d under their stomachs, which is a good diversion to the spectators.” James Alexander provided an account of surfing in Accra, Ghana in 1834 CE: “From the beach, meanwhile, might be seen boys swimming into the sea, with light boards under their stomachs. They waited for a surf; and came rolling like a cloud on top of it. But I was told that sharks occasionally dart in behind the rocks and ‘yam’ them.” Thomas Hutchinson provided an account of surfing in southern Cameroon in 1861: “Fishermen rode small dugouts ‘no more than six feet in length, fourteen to sixteen inches in width, and from four to six inches in depth.’”

== Polynesia ==
The art of surfing, known as heʻe nalu (literally, wave sliding) in the Hawaiian language, was recorded by Joseph Banks in his journal aboard HMS Endeavour while on the first voyage of James Cook, during the ship's stay in Tahiti in 1769:

...their cheif [sic] amusement was carried on by the stern of an old canoe, with this before them they swam out as far as the outermost breach, then one or two would get into it and opposing the blunt end to the breaking wave were hurried in with incredible swiftness. Sometimes they were carried almost ashore...

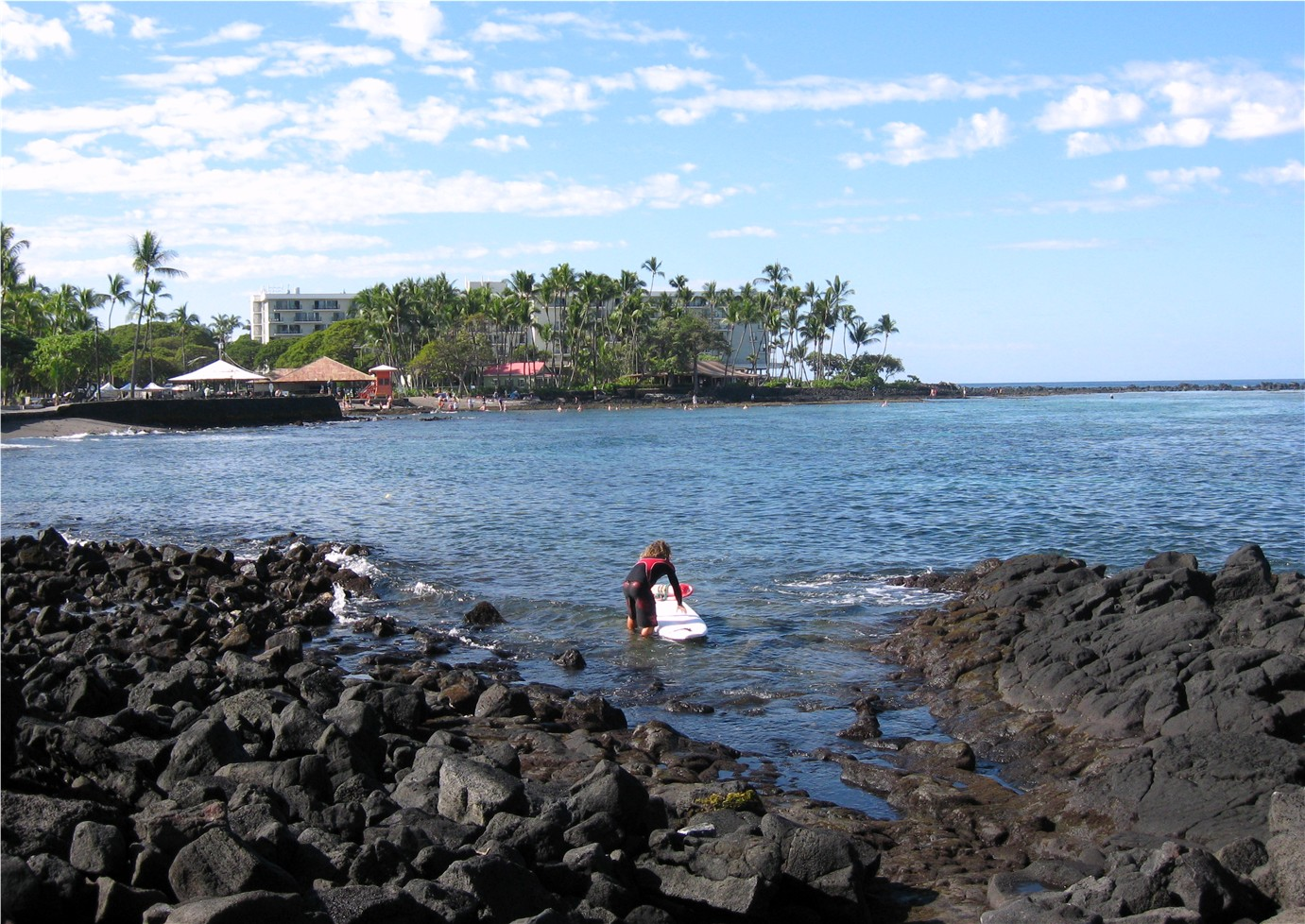
Kahaluʻu Bay was the site of an ancient surfing temple.

Surfing was a central part of Polynesian culture, prior to European contact. In ancient Hawaiʻi, surfing was practiced across all social classes, though certain surf breaks (such as Kalehuawehe) were restricted to high-ranking chiefs (aliʻi) under the kapu caste system. Chiefs also held rights to exclusive use of long olo surfboards, often made from koa or lightweight wiliwili wood, suitable for large, gently-breaking swells, while commoners (makaʻāinana) typically rode shorter, thinner alaia boards.

In Tahiti and Samoa, surfing was a widespread recreational pastime observed by early European visitors, who noted Samoans riding planks and single canoe hulls; Samoans referred to surf riding as fa'ase'e or se'egalu. Edward Treager also confirmed Samoan terminology for surfing and surfboards in Samoa. Oral tradition confirms that surfing was also practiced in Tonga, where the late king Taufa'ahau Tupou IV became an expert surfer in his youth. Matt Warshaw, however, says the King began to surf in the 1920 on a board given him by Duke Kahanamoku.

== Ancient Hawaii ==
Hawaiians referred to this art as heʻe nalu which translates into English as "wave sliding." The art began before entering the mysterious ocean as the Hawaiians prayed to the gods for protection and strength to undertake the powerful mystifying ocean. If the ocean was tamed, frustrated surfers would call upon the kahuna (priest), who would aid them in a surfing prayer asking the gods to deliver great surf. Prior to entering the ocean, the priest would also aid the surfers (mainly of the upper class) in undertaking the spiritual ceremony of constructing a surfboard.

Hawaiians would carefully select one of three types of trees. The trees included the koa (Acacia koa), ʻulu (Artocarpus altilis), and wiliwili (Erythrina sandwicensis) trees. Once selected, the surfer would dig the tree out and place fish in the hole as an offering to the gods. Selected craftsmen of the community were then hired to shape, stain, and prepare the board for the surfer. There were three primary shapes: the ʻolo, kikoʻo, and the alaia. The ʻolo is thick in the middle and gradually gets thinner towards the edges. The kikoʻo ranges in length from 370 to 550 cm (12 to 18 ft) and requires great skill to maneuver. The alaia board is around 275 cm (9 ft) long and requires great skill to ride and master. Aside from the preparatory stages prior to entering the water, the most skilled surfers were often of the upper class including chiefs and warriors that surfed amongst the best waves on the island. These upper-class Hawaiians gained respect through their enduring ability to master the waves and this art the Hawaiians referred to as surfing. Some ancient sites still popular today include Kahaluʻu Bay and Holualoa Bay.

== Post-contact Hawaii ==
During James cook's 1778 expedition to Hawaii, the British naval officer Charles Clerke recorded observations of Hawaiian surfing practices. He described surfers using boards that were approximately six to eight feet long and two feet wide. According to Clerke's observations, surfers would lie on their boards, paddle with their hands, and would use their feet to steer the boards. This observation of his was published with some of the earliest recorded European descriptions of surfing in Hawaii. Charles Clerke's account was one of the earliest European descriptions of Hawaiian surfboards about six to eight feet long that surfers paddled with their hands and steered with their feet.

After contact with the Western World Hawaiian culture was forced to change. While Europeans were preoccupied with exploring and later colonizing the Pacific, they defined the islands as specks of land in a faraway sea. Western diseases spread and colonization began, plantations were built, and immigration started. Local Hawaiians, mixed with imported workers from Asia, were put to work on sugar plantations and Protestant missionaries attempted to turn the population from their traditional beliefs into Christians. Along with the suppression of traditional culture was the suppression of surfing, often viewed as frivolous.

Following Western contact, surfing declined in Hawaiʻi during the nineteenth century. Introduced disease caused severe population loss, while the expansion of a cash economy and plantation labor reduced the leisure time available for surfing. Surfing then started to revive in the early twentieth century, when tourism promoters in Hawaiʻi and California used demonstrations of the sport to attract visitors. Particularly wealthy Americans came to the beach and saw the locals occasionally surfing what had long been an established surf break, Waikiki, and wanted to try it. Mark Twain attempted it but failed in 1866. Jack London tried it while visiting, then chronicled it enthusiastically in an essay entitled "A Royal Sport" published in October 1907. In 1908 Alexander Hume Ford founded the Outrigger Canoe and Surfing Club the first modern organization developed to promote surfing broadly, although it was de facto whites-only and women weren't admitted until 1926. Local Hawaiians started their own club in 1911 called Hui Nalu, meaning "Club of the Waves". But the first surf icons who gained widespread recognition, George Freeth and Duke Kahanamoku, became famous for practicing their traditional sport and helped spread it from Waikiki to around the world.

As the news of this new sport began to spread, locals in Waikiki began giving lessons and demonstrations for tourists. This was the basis of the Waikiki Beach Boys, a loose group of mostly native Hawaiians who hung out at the beach, surfed daily, and taught wealthy haole tourists how to ride waves. This was also known as the Hawaiian boarder-land, where white hegemony was uncertain and Natives inverted dominant social categories. A borderland is a place where differences converge and social norms are often fluid. Because state-sanctioned authority is often absent from the borderlands, unique social and cultural identities are formed there. This was the foundation of a continual element of surf culture, repeated around the globe innumerable times and continuing to this day: people who, for at least a time, dedicate most of their daily lives to living on or around the beach and surfing as much as they can. These groups in Hawaii, and following in Australia, California, laid the foundation for modern surf culture around the world.

== North America ==
In July 1885, three teenage Hawaiian princes took a break from their boarding school, St. Mathew's Hall in San Mateo, and came to cool off in Santa Cruz, California. There, David Kawananakoa, Edward Keliʻiahonui, and Jonah Kūhiō Kalanianaʻole surfed the mouth of the San Lorenzo River on custom-shaped redwood boards, according to surf historians Kim Stoner and Geoff Dunn. In 1907 George Freeth traveled to California from Hawaii to demonstrate surfboard riding as a publicity stunt to promote Abbot Kinney's resort in Venice, Venice of America. Later that year, Henry Huntington, who gave his name to Huntington Beach, hired Freeth as a lifeguard and to give surfing demonstrations to promote the city of Redondo Beach. Freeth surfed at the Huntington Beach pier for its rededication in 1914. In 1917 Freeth moved to San Diego to work as a swimming instructor at the San Diego Rowing Club. He later worked as a lifeguard at Coronado and Ocean Beach where he also gave surfing exhibitions.

In 1909, Burke Haywood Bridgers and a group of surfers began surfing in the Wrightsville Beach, North Carolina, area, the earliest surfing documented in the state of North Carolina. The state of North Carolina honored Burke Haywood Bridgers and the Wrightsville surfers by placing a North Carolina Highway Marker for "Pioneer East Coast Surfing" on Wrightsville Beach and designated it as the birthplace of surfing in North Carolina in 2015. Burke Haywood Bridgers and the other surfers around Wrightsville were among the earliest surfers in the Atlantic Ocean. The Wrightsville Beach Museum Waterman Hall of Fame honors, recognizes, and inducts community members for their contributions to the island's watersport culture.

== Australian surfing ==
In 1910, Tommy Walker returned to Manly Beach, Sydney, with a 300 cm (10 ft) surfboard "bought at Waikiki Beach, Hawaii, for two dollars." Walker became an expert rider and in 1912 gave several exhibitions in Sydney.

Surfboard riding received national exposure with the exhibitions by Hawaiian Duke Kahanamoku in the summer of 1914-1915 at several Sydney beaches. As a current Olympic sprint champion, Kahanamoku was invited to tour the Eastern states for an extensive series of swimming carnivals and at his first appearance in the Domain Pool, Sydney, smashed his previous world record for 100 yards by a full second. Following the first exhibition at Freshwater on 24 December 1914, in the New Year Kahanamoku demonstrated his skill at Freshwater and Manly, followed by appearances at Dee Why and Cronulla.

Duke Kahanamoku's board is now on display in the Freshwater Surf Life Saving Club, Sydney, Australia.

== Great Britain ==
In 1890, the pioneer in agricultural education John Wrightson reputedly became the first British surfer at Bridlington in Yorkshire when instructed by two Hawaiian students, Princes David Kahalepouli Kawanaankoa Piikoi and Jonah Kuhio Kalanianaole Pikkoi, studying at his college.

== Modern surfing ==
Around the start of the 20th century, Hawaiians living close to Waikiki began to revive surfing, and soon re-established surfing as a sport. The revival is linked to real estate development and efforts to boost tourism. The beach was historically a place where haole and Hawaiian worlds collided and violence was sometimes a substitute for mutual understanding. Duke Kahanamoku, "Ambassador of Aloha," Olympic medalist, and avid waterman, helped expose surfing to the world. Kahanamoku's role was later memorialized by a 2002 first class letter rate postage stamp of the United States Postal Service. Author Jack London wrote about the sport after having attempted surfing on his visit to the islands. Surfing progressed tremendously in the 20th century, through innovations in board design and ever-increasing public exposure.

Surfing's development and culture was centered primarily in three locations: Hawaii, Australia, and California, although the first footage of surfing in the UK was in 1929 by Louis Rosenberg and a number of friends after being fascinated by watching some Australian surfers. In 1959 the release of the film Gidget, based on the life of surfer Kathy Kohner-Zuckerman, boosted the sport's popularity immensely, moving surfing from an underground culture into a national fad and packing many surf breaks with sudden and previously unheard of crowds. B-movies and surf music such as the Beach Boys and Surfaris based on surfing and Southern California beach culture (Beach Party films) as it exploded, formed most of the world's first ideas of surfing and surfers. This conception was revised again in the 1980s, with newer mainstream portrayals of surfers represented by characters like Jeff Spicoli from Fast Times at Ridgemont High.

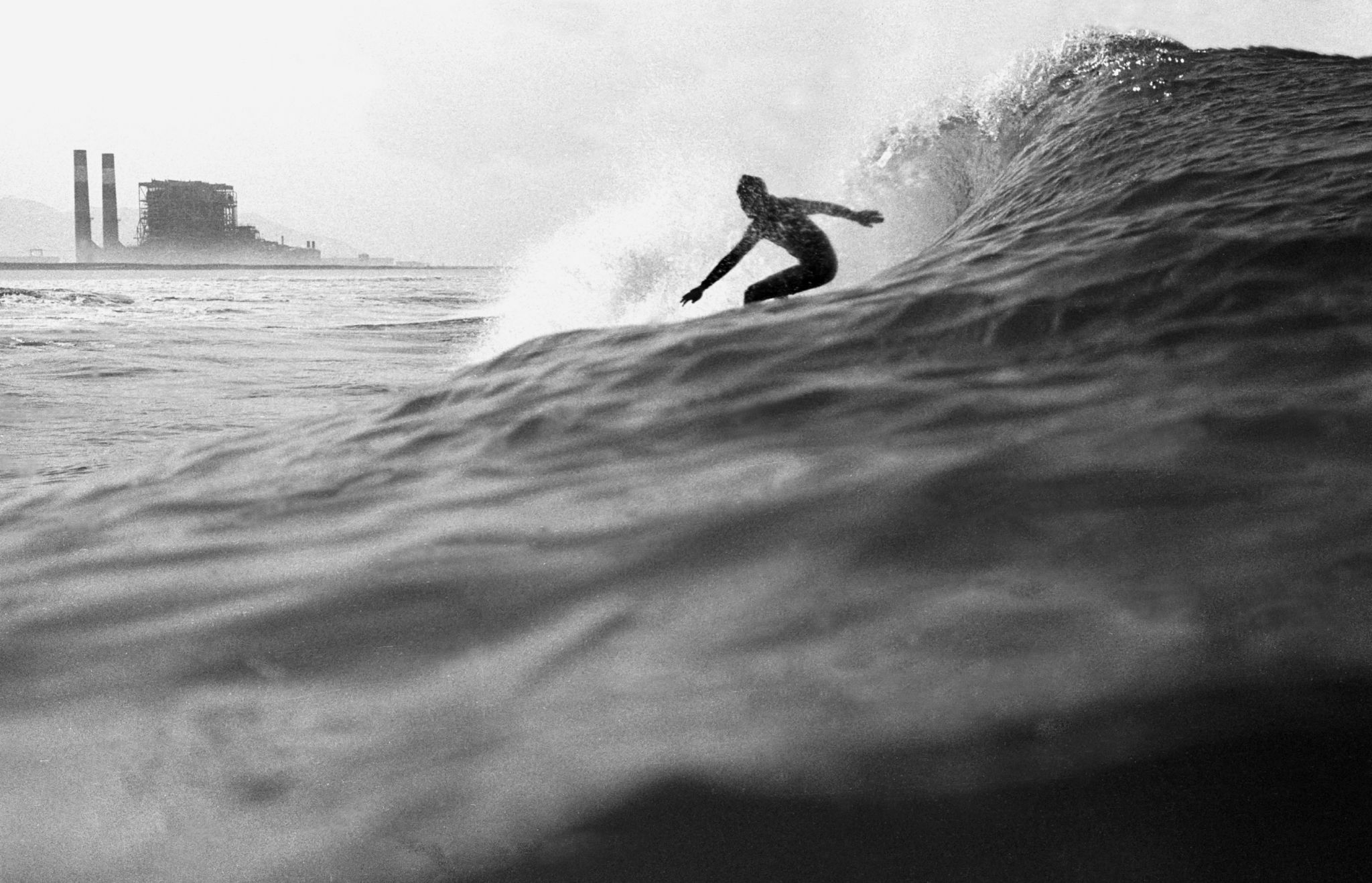
Surfing at Ormond Beach in Oxnard, California, in 1975

The anonymous sleeve notes on the 1962 album Surfin' Safari, the first album to be released on the Capitol label by The Beach Boys, include a rather tongue-in-cheek description of the sport of surfing thus:

"For those not familiar with the latest craze to invade the sun-drenched Pacific coast of Southern California, here is a definition of "surfing" - a water sport in which the participant stands on a floating slab of wood, resembling an ironing board in both size and shape, and attempts to remain perpendicular while being hurtled toward the shore at a rather frightening rate of speed on the crest of a huge wave (especially recommended for teen-agers and all others without the slightest regard for either life or limb)."

Regardless of its usually erroneous portrayal in the media, true surfing culture continued to evolve quietly by itself, changing decade by decade. From the 1960s fad years to the creation and evolution of the short board in the late 60s and early 70s to the performance hotdogging of the neon-drenched 1980s and the epic professional surfing of the 1990s (typified by Kelly Slater, the "Michael Jordan of Surfing"). In 1975, professional contests started. That year Margo Oberg became the first female professional surfer.

Surfing documentaries have been one of the main ways in which surfing culture grows and replenishes itself, not just as a sport but as an art form, the style and quality of surf films have often tracked well the evolution of the sport.

== Professional surfing ==
Defining the scope of professional surfing is difficult, because like in many extreme sports, there is more than one model for what constitutes a professional. There are three main contemporary modes of making money purely as an active surfer: sponsorship, surf contests, and social media influence. Most often all three go together, but sometimes well-known professionals excel in only one.

If a professional surfer is someone who makes money from surfing (not including teaching), then the history of professional surfing dates to perhaps 1959 when the first West Coast Surfing Championships was held in Huntington Beach, California. Previously there had been innumerable amateur competitions, from the ancient Hawaiians themselves who were known to wager on the outcomes, to multiple iterations of surf competition as some form of race (commonly starting from shore, paddling to a buoy, then catching a wave back to shore).

In 1961 the United States Surfing Association (USSA) was founded, arguably the first proto-professional surfing contest organization. This was also about the time when surfing switched from core action: simply riding a quality wave, to a more style-oriented endeavor where turns, tricks, style, and artistry began to be important. Dynamic moves, such as nose-riding, top turns, and cut-backs were becoming even more important than catching the best wave and riding it for the longest possible time, which had previously been the primary goal, and seemed self-evident to earlier surfers.

Through numerous iterations of the surf contest and small sponsorships, very few people ever made a living from surfing alone (by not teaching or producing signature model boards or clothing) until the 1970s. As described in the documentary Bustin' Down the Door much of the prestige and money to be made from contest surfing resided in Hawaii, specifically, the increasingly important epicenter of worldwide performance-surfing: the North Shore of Oahu. But when Australians and South Africans showed up to join the Californians who had been migrating there in waves for nearly 20 years, multiple tensions arose between not only the Americans vs international surfers, but even more powerfully between the local Hawaiians and the haoles generally.

Into the 1980s surfing saw its second boost of wider popular recognition (the first being from Gidget) with new neon colors, increasing shortboard performance, more professional surfers, and a number of surf brands becoming trendy beyond surfing, such as Town & Country Surf Designs and Body Glove. The pro surfers of the 1980s were able to make more money, get more exposure, and generally survive longer with no job other than contest surfing and sponsorship.

In the last few decades there are generally less than 60 men and 30 women who qualify for the highest level of the surf league each year in its modern form, the WSL. There are thousands more surfers competing in various smaller surf contests held continually around the world, the majority of them being for groms (young participants). In the last half century of competitive surfing, nearly all professionals have learned to surf as children and were essentially prodigies, as in most modern professional sports.

In 1920, Duke Kahanamoku, the "Father of Modern Surfing", proposed that the sport be included in the Olympics. Surfing was to be a part of the Olympics for the first time ever in the 2020 Tokyo Olympics, allowing athletes from around the world to show their skills in the sport. Before surfing could make its Olympic debut, the COVID-19 pandemic caused the 2020 Tokyo Olympic Games to be cancelled and then rescheduled for the year 2021. Surfing is set to appear in the 2021 Olympics with several members of the WSL as well as other amateur surfers for the first time ever at Tsurigasaki Beach in Chiba Japan.

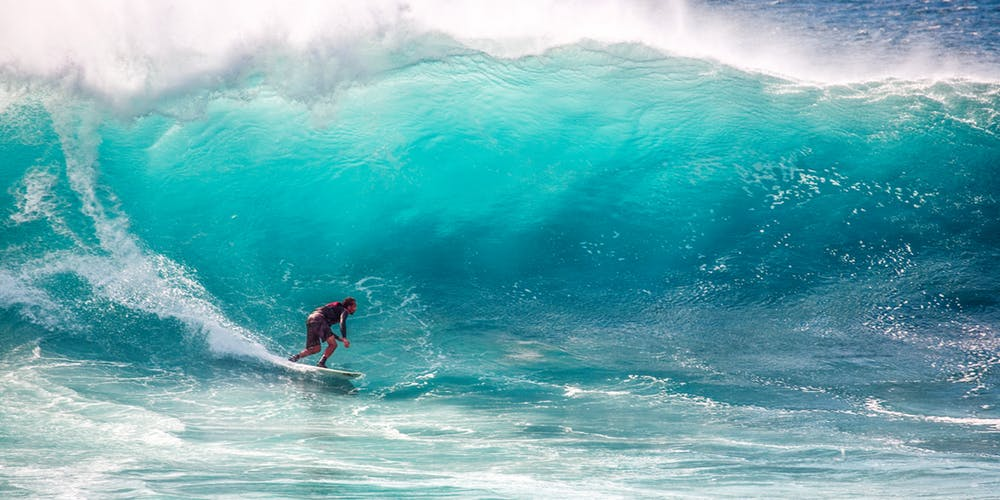
A surfer dropping in

== Technological innovations in surfing ==
Surfing has been an internationally co-developed sport since its early spread beyond Hawaii, and has been highly influenced by (and generally welcoming of) new technology. There are no standards or committees to rule surfboard design or progression. Change has been rampant. Surfers generally pick styles and materials based on performance, feeling, and price. Surfboard shapers can be global name-brand professionals, local artisans, or even backyard amateurs. Unlike many other sports, the high variability and subtle performance differences in the main apparatus, the surfboard, is fundamental to both the experience and history. While many other sports standardize their equipment, in surfing, diversity in craft-design played a huge part in its history and still ongoing culture. California played a important role in the development of lighter, more hydrodynamic surfboards, wave swell forecasting, and more developed wetsuits that allowed surfing to expanded further to colder regions.

Much of the last century of surf history has been defined by new eras of technology which often fundamentally changed the experience. Surfers themselves have often developed, altered, or anticipated new technology to grant increased access to previously non surfed waves and places. And unlike many other sports, the secondary equipment became almost as important as the core surfboard, a prime example being the wetsuit. The worldwide history of surfing could easily be divided between pre-wetsuit and post-wetsuit, because it expanded the potential to surf places previously far too cold, which comprised a vast amount of un-surfed worldwide coastline. On a similar basis, surfing history could justifiably be divided between pre-polystyrene and post-polystyrene surfboards, or pre-fin and post-fin as the original Hawaiian boards did not have fins until Tom Blake added one in 1935. Technology has changed surfing repeatedly and dramatically throughout its modern development, generally making the sport more accessible, cheaper, easier, and raising the level of performance.

Much of this change has also come from the fact that surfing was originally, and for many decades into the modern era, primarily a tropical or summertime only warm water sport, and a developed-world sport, making its early range quite limited. But after the arrival of mass-produced fiberglass boards, quality wetsuits, offroad vehicles, and inexpensive international travel, surfing became accessible along many parts of the world's coasts which were previously unthinkable or unknown as surf spots. Travelers thereby introduced the sport and equipment to the local coastal peoples of even very remote places. By the 21st century, much of the worldwide coastline has been explored and local peoples surf in nearly every country with access to waves. Yet unlike many other aspects of human expansion, there remain surf breaks as yet never ridden by humans, often in remote or treacherous corners of the globe, politically unstable areas, or around uninhabited islands, many which might yet reveal great surf spots in the future.

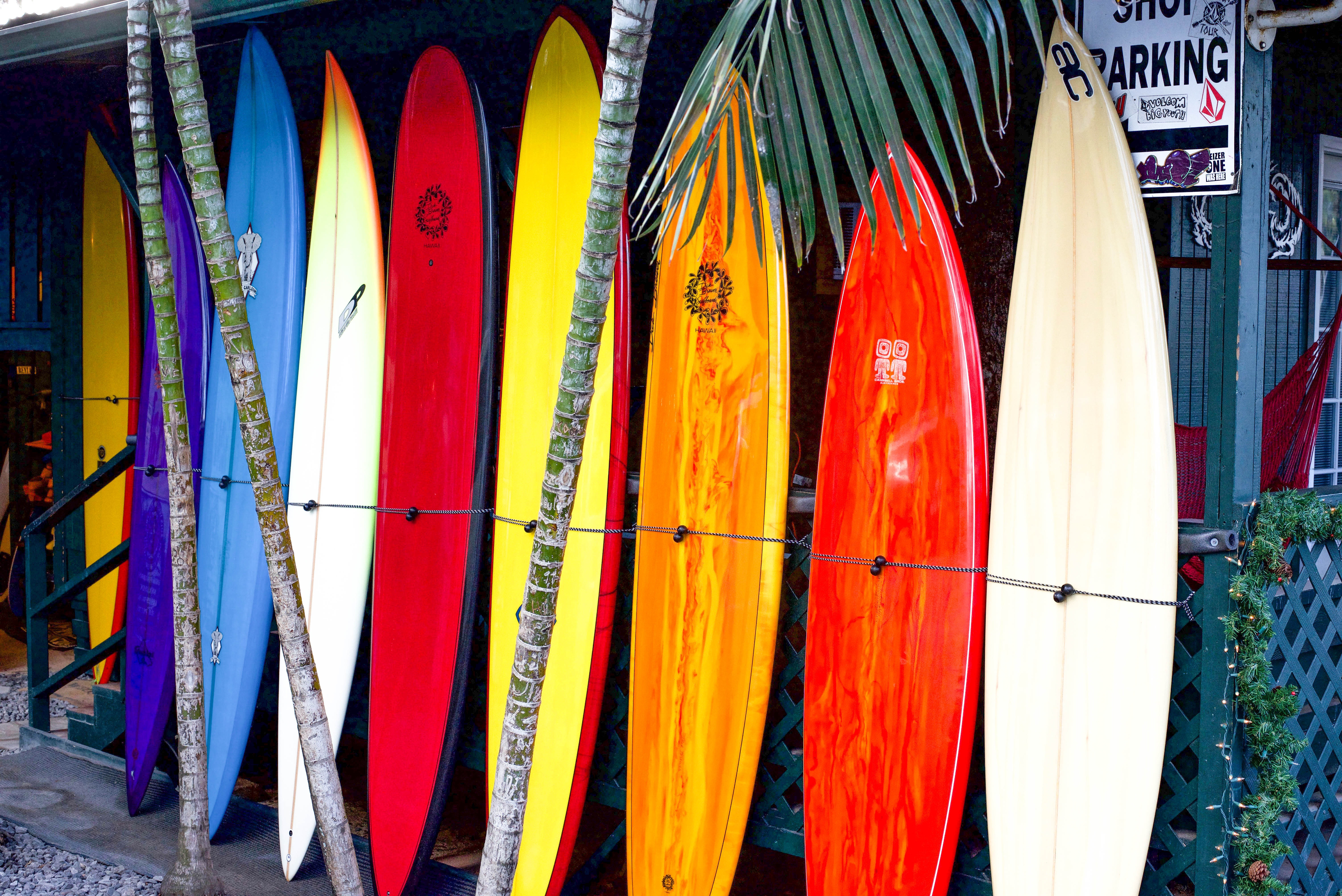
A quiver of surfboards

=== The Short Board Revolution ===
The ancient Hawaiians had mainly three types of board: Olo, Alaia, and Paipo. The Olo was 4.5 to 6.096 meters (14.76 to 20.00 ft) long and solid wood. They were very difficult to make and reserved for the upper classes. The Alai was only 1.82 or 2.13 meters (6.0 or 7.0 ft) long and usually much thinner. The Paipo was even smaller and similar to a modern bodyboard. None of these had a fin.

Throughout the first half of the 20th century nearly all modern surfboards were longboards, generally 2.74 meters (9.0 ft) or longer, although after the 1930s they began to shift away from being solid dense wood and towards lighter materials like balsa wood, and eventually various forms of polystyrene, which still dominate to this day.

Throughout the decades, shapers had occasionally made smaller boards, often as novelties, experiments, or specifically designed for small-statured people, but the popularity of those designs was slow to rise. During the surfboard production boom of the 1960s, the predominantly male shapers would sometimes construct specifically smaller boards for girls (who are often lighter and shorter, affecting weight/length requirements for paddling). Yet often they ended up surfing those small boards themselves because the style of surfing was different and mid-wave turns were growing in popularity, more easily done on shorter boards.

A fundamental reason for longer, thicker, more buoyant surfboards generally is they paddle faster, and paddle-speed is crucial to wave catching. But in the 1960s faster waves were becoming more popular, waves with narrower take off zones, requiring more skill to drop in. If the surfer could catch a fast wave, then a shorter board was inherently more maneuverable (and by extension more fun).

By the early 1970s, shorter boards began to rise dramatically in popularity, not just as novelties but as fulltime craft, so design innovation was not far behind. The number of fins and their location was experimented with. Various nose and tail shapes were tried. Then, by the 1980s, the styles were refined and coalescing into the modern shortboard just as the second large burst of broader surf-culture popularity within the mainstream was occurring. The 3-fin, 1.82 meters (6.0 ft)-tall)"thruster" shortboard began to take over as the most popular design. A generally narrow board with rather small variance in design was being mass-produced. It nearly always has three fins, a pointed nose, a squash tail, and was approximately the height of the rider.

This basic style of board, with many small modifications, has been the dominant craft since the 1980s and is still the approximation of the modern professional surfboard. In 21st century professional surfing the common boards have slowly become shorter and wider, with a more rounded nose and sometimes 4-fins (very rarely 2-fins and never 1-fin), although non-professionals still regularly mix and match all those options based on personal taste.

== Big wave surfing ==
Although the original Hawaiian surfers would ride large unbreaking ocean swells on their Olo boards, surfing a breaking wave larger than 4.5 to 6.1 meters (15 to 20 ft) was extremely challenging with pre-modern equipment, if it was attempted at all. But once board design began advancing rapidly in the 1950s and 1960s these larger and faster waves became more accessible. The first truly renowned big wave spot was Oahu's Waimea Bay. As the North Shore of Oahu was being explored for all its various breaks, Waimea was seen as too fast, brutal, and difficult. As detailed in the movie Riding Giants the first documented successful attempt was in October 1957. Once Waimea was finally surfed, it spawned the search for other giant waves around the world, and a devotional subset of surfers who specifically desired to surf very large waves. By the 1990s there were numerous giant waves being surfed all over the world, some regularly reaching the 12.2, 15.2, even 18.3 meters (40-, 50-, 60-ft) range. Big wave surfing bifurcated into two main branches: paddle-in and tow-in. Some waves are so big and quick it is nearly impossible to paddle fast enough to catch them, so surfers started towing behind boats and PWCs in order to catch the wave.

== Style versus performance ==
"What is the purpose of surfing?" has long been philosophically debated in and out of surf culture. Often the entire endeavor has been viewed in the popular media as a waste of time, or the occupation of slackers. For the most part, surfing is agreed to be purely recreational, as it did not develop from, or turn into, a useful mode of daily transportation (as opposed to skiing or skateboarding, which can be both). Therefore in judging and appreciating surfing there has always been varying opinions about what is necessary, stylish, extravagant, and/or functional.

The variety and size of waves varies tremendously, as does surf craft, and to some degree even the medium. Harnessing the momentum of a wave for travel is the loosest definition of surfing, so in popular culture, the term is often applied to many forms of expanded "surfing". Particularly "surfing the web" and "couch surfing" common examples. But also characters like The Silver Surfer have taken the notion of surfing into science fiction.

There are also those who view surfing in a religious context. Certainly for the ancient Hawaiians, this component was important because the ocean was viewed as a deity. Yet also in modern surfing it is common for surfing to refer to it as some form of church or mass.

== Surfing's impact on popular culture ==
Comparatively small and localized surfing cultures have repeatedly generated surprisingly large influence upon popular culture, particularly in the United States of America and Australia, as well as upon the global consciousness of surfing as a form of recreation. Since the expansion of surfing in the mid-20th century, there have been numerous coastal towns that were situated near good surf breaks, whose citizens did not yet know about modern surfing, and so did not even realize it was a rare commodity.

In America and Australia, the culture of surfing has influenced popular culture in periodic fads, starting with novels, movies, and the early-1960s TV show, Gidget. Gidget is often given credit for popularizing surfing as a "slightly strange and hedonistic lifestyle". In film specifically, the surfing image has been so popular that it inspired an entire “beach party/surf film genre”. The attention that surfing has received in popular culture has waxed and waned, much like other niche sports.

Another area of popular culture where surfing has had significant influence is popular music. As many scholars recognize, a large part of surfing’s popularity is from the positively connoted image of “beach parties, rich tans, loose clothing, and surf-ready cars"; in other words, there is "more to surfing than the sea”. This image is very well suited to be represented in popular music, which is why so many popular teen anthems are based on the surfing craze. The Beach Boys, a group whose songs frequently involved “an endless summer filled with surfing, cruising, and beachcombing,” is only one such example. In the first half of the 1960s especially, popular music was dominated by exuberant music featuring the surf craze ("surf rock"). Another example is Katy Perry’s Billboard #1 hit song “California Gurls,” featuring Snoop Dogg released in 2010, which highlights the same beachside lifestyle first popularized in the 1960s.

Fashions developed within surf culture have had a large worldwide impact numerous times from the 1960s to the present. A number of large clothing brands began as surfing brands, including but not limited to: OP, Stussy, Billabong, Quicksilver, Roxy, Hurley, O'Neill, Ripcurl, RVCA, Vans, Volcom, Reef, and Da Kine. One of the largest influences is probably the worldwide adoption of boardshorts as swim gear for men.

== Alternatives to wind-generated waves ==
Since their invention, surfers have sometimes used wave pools to attempt surfing, but generally, the waves were too small and not well-formed enough for an enjoyable experience. The 1987 movie North Shore started the protagonist in an Arizona wave pool, then going on to Hawaii to try his luck. Both in and out of the movie this was considered basically a joke. But more recently, multiple attempts have been made to construct wave pools specifically designed for surfing. As of 2023 there are only a few around the world open to the public, but there are numerous in development. 2018 was the first year a professional surfing contest was held at a wave pool, specifically: Kelly Slater's Surf Ranch.

Wakeboarding is a popular type of surfing done behind a boat's wake. There are also sometimes standing waves in rivers at high flow which can be surfable. At certain times of year on large rivers, tidal bores are surfable. People have also surfed alongside large cargo ships as their wakes roll into shallower water, and a few people have even surfed the waves caused by calving glaciers. The Wave Bristol opened in The UK as an inland artificial surf site.
