= Schwyzer =

Schwyzer is a surname. Notable people with the surname include:

- Eduard Schwyzer (1874–1943), Swiss linguist
- Hugo Schwyzer (born 1967), American professor and writer
- Philip Schwyzer (born 1970), American-British author and educator

== See also ==
- Sweitzer (surname)
- Switzer (surname)
- Schweitzer
- Schweizer
