= Schweizer =

Schweizer is a surname meaning "Swiss" in German. Notable people with the surname include:

- Bernard Schweizer (born 1962), American professor of English
- Brandun Schweizer, American politician
- Clara Schweizer (born 2002), German politician
- David Schweizer (director) (1949 or 1950–2024), American theatre director
- Eduard Schweizer (1913–2006), Swiss New Testament scholar
- Irène Schweizer (1941–2024), Swiss jazz and free improvising pianist
- J. Otto Schweizer (1863–1955) Swiss-American sculptor
- Julián Schweizer (born 1998), Uruguayan surfer
- Karissa Schweizer (born 1996), American long-distance runner
- Kaspar Gottfried Schweizer (1816–1873), Swiss astronomer
- Katja Schweizer (née Weisser) (born 1978), German curler and coach
- Matthias Eduard Schweizer (1818–1860), chemist, inventor of the Schweizer's reagent
- Meta Heusser-Schweizer (1797–1876), Swiss poet
- Peter Schweizer (born 1964), American author
- Sarah Schweizer (born 1983), German politician
- Schweizer brothers (Paul, William, and Ernest), brothers and founders of Schweizer Aircraft
- Werner Schweizer (1916–2003), Swiss rower

== See also ==
- Sweitzer (surname)
- Switzer (surname)
- Schweitzer
- Schwyzer
