= Switzer (surname) =

Switzer is the surname of the following people

- Barbara Switzer (born 1940), English trade unionist
- Barry Switzer (born 1937), American football coach
- Bill Switzer (born 1984), Canadian actor
- Bob Switzer (1914–1997), American inventor of fluorescent paint
- Carl Switzer (1927–1959), American actor and singer
- Carroll O. Switzer (1908–1960), American judge and politician
- George Switzer (born 1973), English football player
- George Switzer (mineralogist) (1915–2008), American mineralogist
- Harold Switzer (1925–1967), American child actor and child singer
- Jon Switzer (born 1979), baseball player
- Kathrine Switzer (born 1947), American marathon runner and author
- Kyle Switzer (born 1985), Canadian actor
- Mary E. Switzer (1900–1971), American social reformer
- Michael Switzer, American film and television director
- Peter Switzer (born 1954), Australian business and financial commentator
- Richard Switzer (born 1995), American film producer
- Rick Switzer (born 1944), Canadian sculptor
- Robert M. Switzer (1863–1952), American politician from Ohio
- Ryan Switzer (born 1994), American football player
- Stephen Switzer (1682–1745), English garden designer and writer
- Tom Switzer (born 1971), Australian newspaper editor
- Travis Switzer (born 1992), American football coach
- Veryl Switzer (1932–2022), American football player
- William Switzer (1920–1969), Canadian politician from Alberta

== See also ==
- Sweitzer (surname)
- Schweitzer
- Schweizer
- Schwyzer
