= Schweizer (disambiguation) =

Schweizer is a surname.

Schweizer may also refer to:

- Schweizer (chicken)
- Schweizer Aircraft, an American producer of sailplanes and helicopters, owned by Sikorsky Aircraft since 2004
- Schweizer-Reneke, a town in the North West Province of South Africa
