= Olo board =

Traditional Hawaiian surfboard

Olo
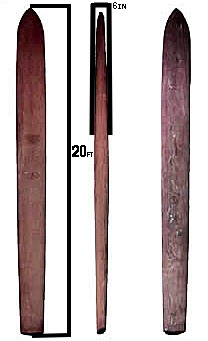
- O'lo surfboard, 20 feet long and 6 inches thick.
- Other names: O'lo, oulou, olo surfboard, olo board
- Classification: Surfboard
- Uses: Surfing
- Inventor: Hawaiian people
- Related: Alaia, paipo board, durfboard

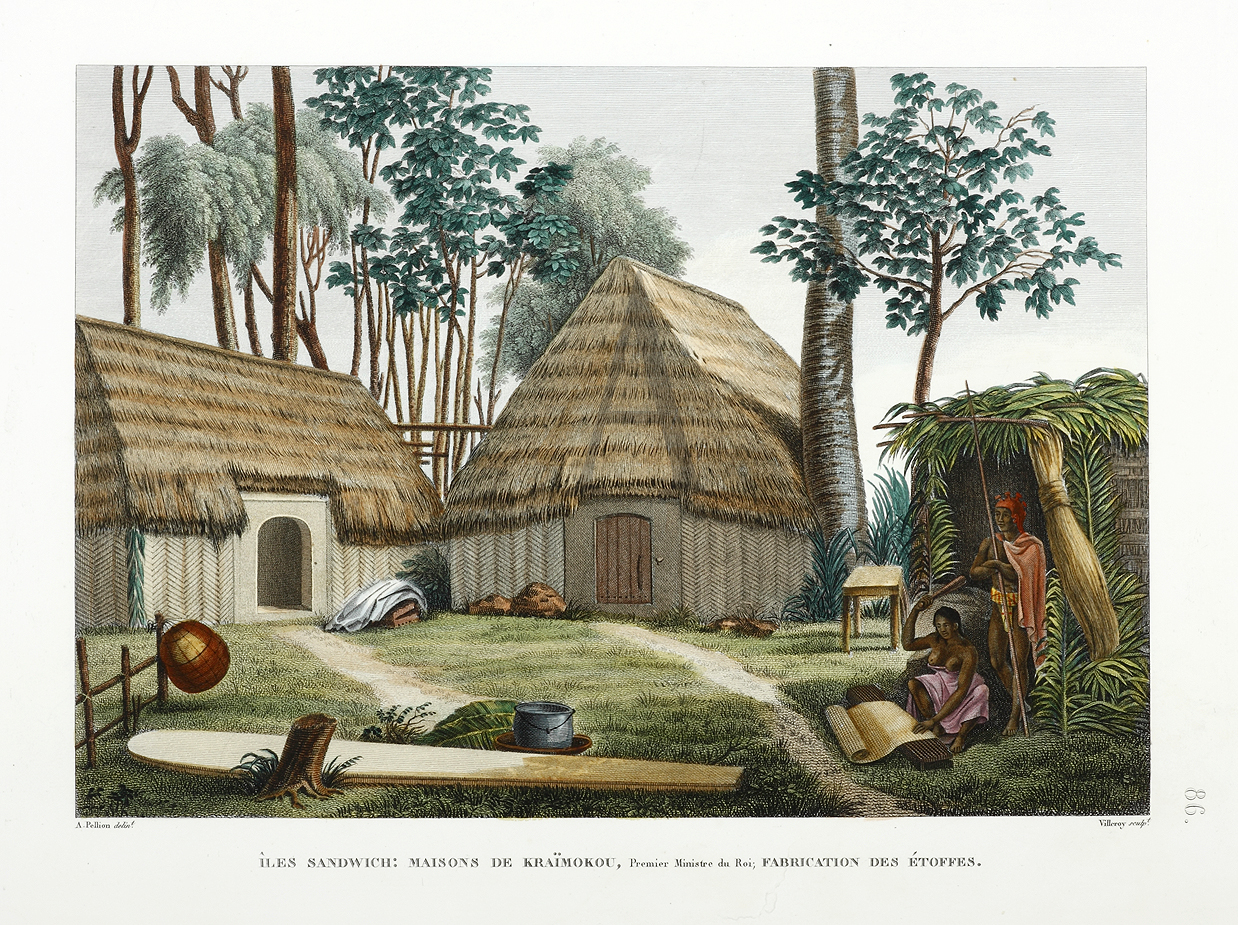
Prime Minister Kalanimoku standing in the doorway of one of his houses in the company of his wife Likelike, shown with her right arm raised and about to strike a sheet of kapa. In the foreground is an Olo board, the largest of the Hawaiian wood surfboards. Reserved for royalty, they ranged in size from 1.8 to 8 meters. Illustration of native Hawaiians surf-riding (surfing) from an article entitled "Our Neighbors of the Sandwich Islands" in Hutchings' California Magazine, November 30, 1858.

The Olo, Olo board or Olo surfboard (pronounced: /ˈoʊloʊ/; Hawaiian: Oʻlo) is a traditional long Hawaiian surfboard that was used by Hawaiian chieftains for surfing. The Olo surfboard was the largest out of the three types of traditional surfboards (Alaia and Paipo board being the two other types) that were used by the Hawaiian people. The Olo is twice as long as the modern surfing longboard, measuring up to 5.18 metres (17.0 ft) long, 16.5 inches wide and nearly 6 inches thick. The board was more than 76.20 kilograms (168.0 lb) and was used for surfing large waves and even tsunamis. The boards were strictly meant for Hawaiian Chieftains and Kings.

== Origins ==
The Olo (also called O'lo) was the largest type of surfboard, it was considered a prized possession and an important object for Hawaiian noblemen. The board was typically 16 to 20 feet long and was strictly intended for Hawaiian chieftains, the Alii or noblemen and royalty (mostly kings). The Olo was the hardest to ride as it didn't have any fins on the bottom which made it hard to manoeuvre, it required the surfer to lie down and use their hands to steer it. The board was also dangerous to ride because its length and weight could be hard to control while riding it which could cause injuries. The Olo was primarily used for surfing gently sloping waves but it was also used for larger Ocean waves and even tsunami's, it could cut right through most small, moderately or large sized waves. Surfing, an important activity in Polynesian culture, originated in Hawaii around AD 400. Polynesians brought customs, including playing on Paipo boards, to the Hawaiian Islands from Tahiti and the Marquesas Islands. The art of standing and surfing upright on boards was invented in Hawaii, the boards size was increased for the purpose of more power while surfing. European explorers described the surfboards that were used by the average Hawaiian surfers but also the eye catching ginormous O'lo boards used by Hawaiian chieftains. European explorers that described them such as Samuel Wallis and Joseph Banks, may have observed surfing in Polynesia. Lieutenant James King (Royal Navy officer) was the first to write about surfing on Hawaii, after Captain James Cook death in 1779. Herman Melville 1849 novel Mardi describes the "Rare Sport at Ohonoo" as requiring a surf-board, which was five feet in length, convex on both sides, highly polished, and rounded at the ends. Mark Twain visited Hawaii in 1866 and observed a large group of naked natives enjoying the sport. References to surf riding on planks and single canoe hulls are also found in pre-contact Samoa and Tonga, far pre-dating the practice of surfing by Hawaiians and eastern Polynesians by over a thousand years.

== Materials ==
Olo boards were primarily made from Redwood, Koa wood, Ulu wood or Wiliwili. Olo boards required a strong, hard, durable and very dense type of wood for the use of riding it on larger ocean waves, they also required stronger wood since they were long and heavy which could cause cracks or huge splits if weak types of wood were used.

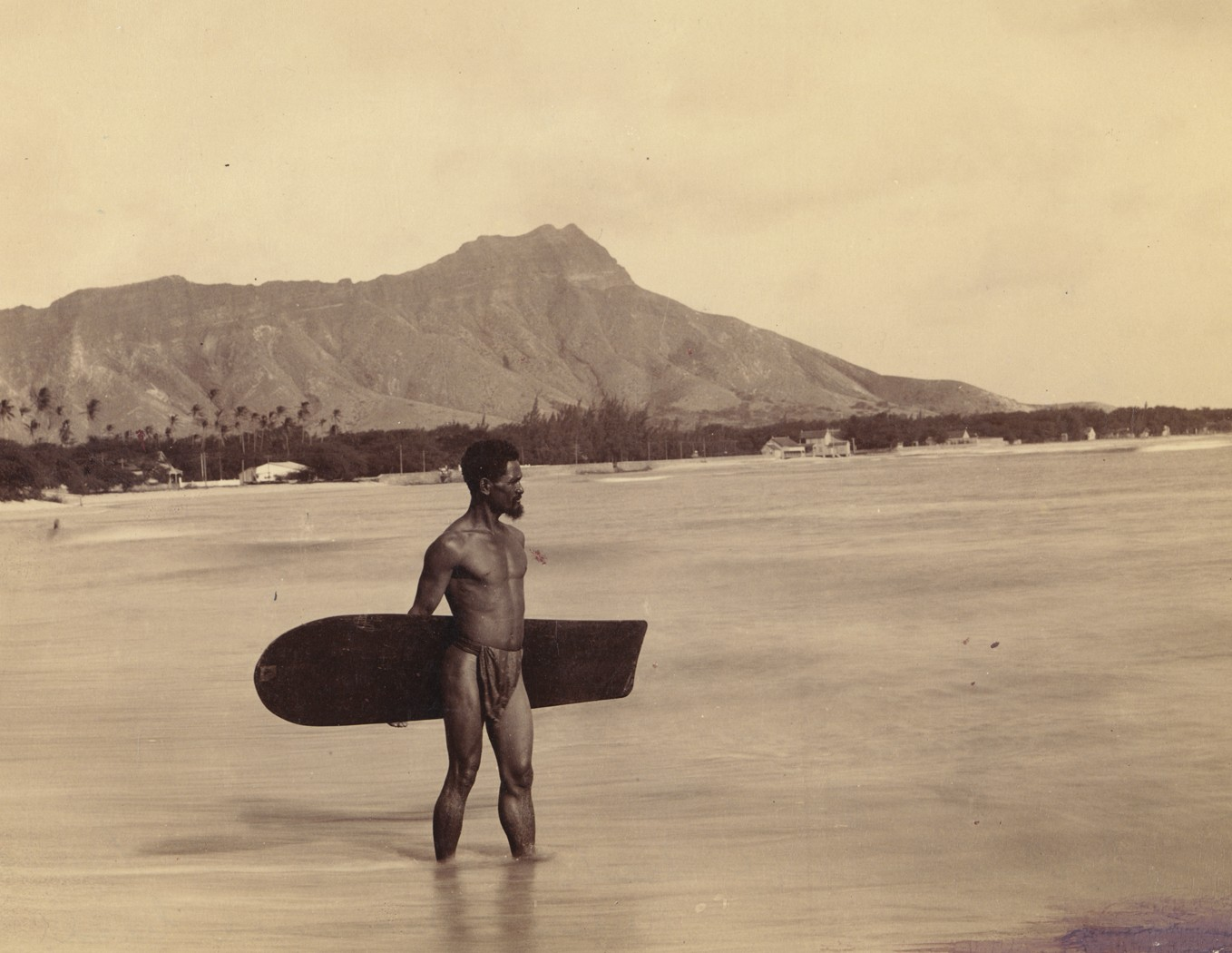
A lone Hawaiian surfer wearing the malo at Waikiki beach carries one of the last Alaia surf boards. The surfer was Charles Kauha. Frank Davey photographed Charles Kauha in 1898 in numerous poses, but none are of Kauha surfing.

== Modern uses ==
Today the Olo board is considered as a relic, most authentic pre-20th century olo boards are on display in museums around the world, mostly in Hawaii, the remaining boards are kept as heirlooms and prized possessions. Olo boards were expensive to build and required a lot of skill, they required very high quality materials to make. Some avid and professional surfers in the present may prefer and use traditional and old types of Hawaiian surfboards that are antiques or those made recently from traditional techniques and materials. The olo board is no longer popular, but it is an important part of Hawaiian surfing.

== See also ==
- Alaia
- Surfing
- Surfboard
- Hawaii
- Polynesia
