= J. Russell Sweitzer =

American politician (1890–1988)

James Russell Sweitzer
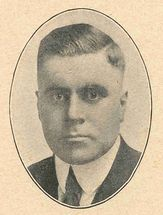
- Sweitzer in 1921
- Born: December 15, 1890; Mifflin, Pennsylvania, U.S.
- Died: 1988; St. Paul, Minnesota, U.S.
- Education: Hamline University
- Occupation: Politician
- Office: Member of the Minnesota House of Representatives
- Political party: Republican

James Russell Sweitzer (December 15, 1890 – 1988) was a politician from the U.S. State of Minnesota.

Sweitzer was born in Mifflin, Pennsylvania on December 15, 1890. While he was a young child, his parents moved to North Dakota and shortly after to St. Paul, Minnesota. Sweitzer graduated from Hamline University in 1911. In 1914, he married Blanche Arabella Heneman. From August 1917 until April 1919, Sweitzer served as a member of the 48th division of the United States Army Coast Artillery Corps.

In 1920, he ran for the Minnesota House of Representatives, for District 42. His campaign was successful, and Sweitzer took office on January 3, 1921. He held the seat until 1936. Although the legislature was officially nonpartisan, Sweitzer was active within the Republican Party of Minnesota.

In 1938, Sweitzer was named the leader of the State G.O.P. Planning Body.

In 1944, he ran for Lieutenant Governor of Minnesota, placing third in the primary with 10.25%, losing to C. Elmer Anderson.

In the 1953 St. Paul Winter Carnival, Sweitzer played King Boreas XVII, a personification of winter.

Sweitzer died in St. Paul in 1988.
