= Morgan Sweitzer =

American farmer and fruit grower

Morgan Sweitzer, born Louis Morgan Sweitzer (October 29, 1891 - August 31, 1953) was an American farmer and fruit grower who donated land to the state of Colorado to establish a recreational lake for the public. He died in 1953,12 years before Sweitzer Lake State Park was completed.
