= Clara Schweizer =

German politician (born 2002)

Member of the Landtag of Baden-Württemberg
- Incumbent
- Assumed office 11 May 2026

Personal details
- Born: 14 August 2002 (age 23)
- Party: Alliance 90/The Greens

Clara Schweizer (born 14 August 2002) is a German politician who was elected member of the Landtag of Baden-Württemberg in 2026. She has served as co-spokesperson of Alliance 90/The Greens in Nürtingen since 2022.
