= Sweitzer Lake State Park =

State park in Colorado

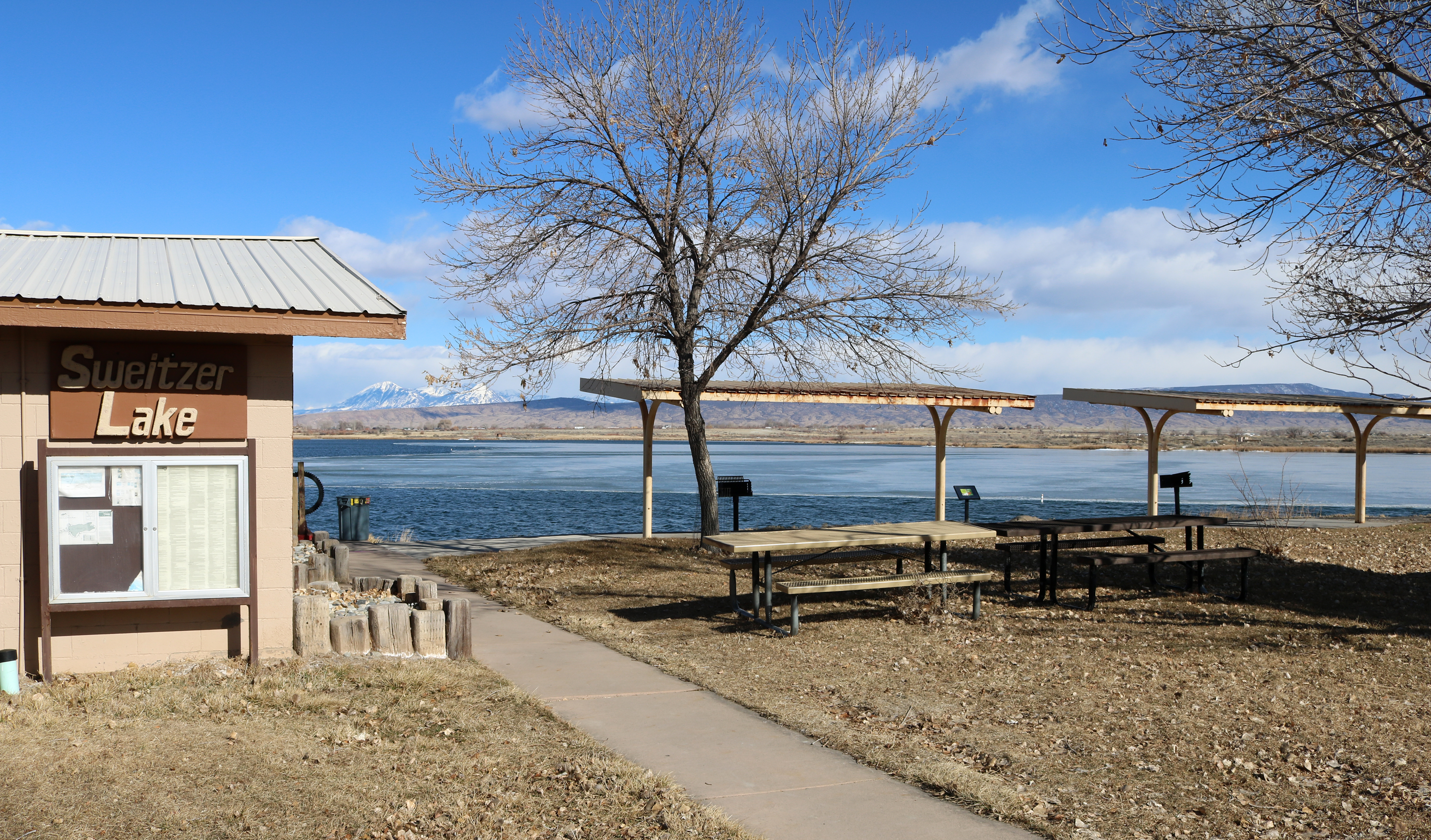
- Looking across Sweitzer Lake

- Location within Colorado
- Location: Delta County, Colorado, United States
- Nearest city: Delta, CO
- Coordinates: 38°42′44″N 108°02′27″W
- Area: 210 acres (85 ha)
- Established: 1960
- Visitors: 63,845 (in 2021)
- Governing body: Colorado Parks & Wildlife

Sweitzer Lake State Park is a Colorado state park located in Delta County 1 mile (1.6 km) south of Delta, Colorado. The 210-acre (85 ha) park established in 1960 includes a 137-acre (55 ha) reservoir. Facilities include a boat ramp, swim beach and picnic sites. Birdwatchers have spotted 170 different species in the park. A portion of the park's land was donated by the eponymous Morgan Sweitzer in order to develop it as a recreation destination.
