= Sweitzer Lake (Minnesota) =

Lake in the state of Minnesota, United States

- Location within Minnesota
- Location: Hubbard County, Minnesota
- Coordinates: 46°56′58″N 95°0′21″W
- Type: lake

Sweitzer Lake is a lake in Hubbard County, in the U.S. state of Minnesota.

Sweitzer Lake was named for an early settler.

== See also ==
- List of lakes in Minnesota
