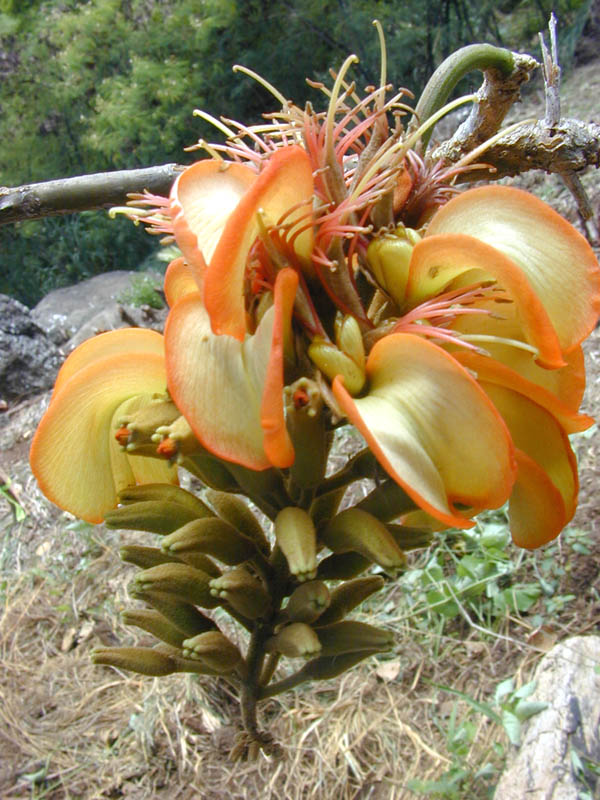
- Raceme of wiliwili

Conservation status
- Vulnerable (IUCN 3.1)

Scientific classification
- Kingdom: Plantae
- Clade: Tracheophytes
- Clade: Angiosperms
- Clade: Eudicots
- Clade: Rosids
- Order: Fabales
- Family: Fabaceae
- Subfamily: Faboideae
- Genus: Erythrina
- Species: E. sandwicensis

Binomial name
- Erythrina sandwicensis O.Deg.

= Wiliwili =

Species of legume

Wiliwili (Erythrina sandwicensis) is a species of tree in the pea family, Fabaceae, that is endemic to the Hawaiian Islands. It is the only species of Erythrina that naturally occurs there. It is typically found in Hawaiian tropical dry forests on leeward island slopes up to an elevation of 600 m (2,000 ft).

Wiliwili means "repeatedly twisted" in the Hawaiian language and refers to the seedpods, which dehisce, or twist open, to reveal the seeds.

== Description ==
Wiliwili trees grow to a height of 4.5–9 m (15–30 ft) with a gnarled and stout trunk that reaches 0.3–0.9 m (0.98–2.95 ft) in diameter. The bark is smooth, slightly fissured, and covered in gray or black spines up to 1 cm (0.39 in) in length. The bark on the main trunk of mature trees has a distinct orange cast, which is caused by a terrestrial alga.

The wiliwili is summer (dry season) drought deciduous. The dry season usually begins in late April or in May, and trees in the wild typically lose all of their leaves before they bloom. Trees in cultivation may retain much of their foliage through blooming time. The flowers appear in the first half of the dry season, from April through July. They form on horizontal or nearly horizontal racemes that are 7.5–15 cm (3.0–5.9 in) long. The flower color may be orange, yellow, salmon, greenish or whitish. Sometimes all of these colors occur in a single population. The standard petal is erect, not enclosing the other petals. Like all of the erythrinas, the wiliwili is pollinated by birds. The horizontal raceme and the erect standard are adaptations to pollination by passerine birds. Many other erythrinas are pollinated by hummingbirds, which do not occur in Hawaii.

Pods develop and persist on the tree, with the seeds remaining attached long after the pods have opened. The seeds are dislodged by heavy downpours that generally start around November in the islands. Many seeds germinate quickly, and a well-established seedling can grow to 4 ft (1.2 m) in height before the start of the next dry season.

That the wiliwili bears spines is unusual for a species that has evolved in the isolated Hawaiian Islands, without the presence of ungulates or other large herbivores. Many plants in the islands have consequently evolved away the protection of spines. The wiliwili is thought to be closely related to E. tahitensis, a tree endemic to the Tahitian Archipelago, and E. velutina, a widespread species found in tropical South America and the Caribbean.

== Distribution ==
Wiliwili is occasionally seen in cultivation in Hawaiʻi. It is easily propagated from cuttings. Seven other species of Erythrina were under general cultivation in the Hawaiian Islands, but have been mostly extirpated by the alien gall wasp (see Conservation, below). They were popular street trees in dry areas and windbreaks on fields. At least 80 others have been known in botanical gardens there. No non-native species of Erythrina is known to be naturalized in Hawaiʻi.

The wiliwili is distinguished from the other seven cultivated species by a pod with only one to three red or yellow-orange seeds, which sink in water; non-native Erythrina have pods with larger numbers of brown seeds, which float in water.

== Ecological role ==
The species supports soil stabilization, carbon sequestration, and air quality regulation, and serves as habitat for native Hawaiian birds.

== Uses ==
Native Hawaiians made a number of items from wiliwili wood because of its low density, such as mouo (fishing net floats), ama (outrigger canoe floats, and extremely long papa heʻe nalu (surfboards) called olo. Olo, which averaged 18 feet (5.5 m), were exclusively ridden by aliʻi (royalty). The wood was sometimes used for the waʻa (hull) of outrigger canoes intended to be used near-shore, for recreation, or for training. The shiny orange-red seeds were strung into lei.

== Conservation ==
Like many other native species in Hawaiʻi, the wiliwili is threatened by competition with non-native species that are free of the diseases, parasites, and herbivores that constrain them in their original habitats.

It was additionally reported in December 2005 that the Hawaiian wiliwili population was under immediate threat due to an infestation by a gall wasp, Quadrastichus erythrinae, which had been first reported in Hawaiʻi in April of that year. This invasive species appears to have arrived in Hawaiʻi via southern Taiwan, Singapore and southern China within only two years. This species was not previously known to science and was formally named and described in 2004. It is thought to have originated in Africa, and the means of its rapid dispersal across South Asia, the Pacific, and southern North America is not understood. The majority of trees of introduced Erythrina species have died as a result of gall wasp infestation. Native wiliwili forests have also been hard hit, particularly Puʻu o Kali on the island of Maui - prior to 2001, the best remaining example of a Hawaiʻi low elevation dryland forest ecosystem. The USGS-Pacific Island Ecosystems Research Center study site now documents the destructive impact of two invasive insect species (African bruchid beetle Specularius impressithorax and erythrina gall wasp) on Erythrina sandwicensis.

A parasitoid wasp, Eurytoma erythrinae, was released by the Hawaiʻi Department of Agriculture in December 2008 as a biocontrol to minimize the damaging effects of Quadrastichus. Eurytoma wasps lay their eggs in the galls created by Quadrastichus wasps. Eurytoma larvae hatch faster than Quadrastichus larvae, on which they exclusively feed. The introduction of Eurytoma has reduced the population of Quadrastichus to a point where the wiliwili trees no longer die, but still have a much reduced production of viable seeds. That's largely because Eurytoma larvae need to feed on multiple Quadrastichus to complete their development, and egg-laying female Eurytoma therefore ignore small isolated galls containing a single larva. The Hawaii Departments of Agriculture and of Land & Natural Resources therefore plan to introduce a second parasitoid wasp from Africa, Aprostocetus nitens. The smaller A. nityens completes its development feeding from a single Quadrastichus larva, and it is therefore expected to complement Eurytoma by targeting isolated larvae.

Wiliwili is threaten by land development, wildfire, grazing by introduced ungulates, like goats, and competition with invasive and non-native plant species.

== History ==
The genus Erythrina was established by Linnaeus in 1753 in his book, Species Plantarum. The name means "red", a reference to the flower color of some of the well-known species.

In 1786, in his book Encyclopédie Méthodique: Botanique, Jean-Baptiste Lamarck originated the name Erythrina monosperma for a Leguminous tree from India and Southeast Asia. That tree has been known as Butea monosperma ever since William Roxburgh created the genus Butea in 1795.

Unaware of Lamarck's name, Charles Gaudichaud-Beaupré created the name Erythrina monosperma for the Hawaiian Erythrina in 1830 in his book Voyage of the Uranus.

In 1841, William Jackson Hooker and George Arnott used Gaudichaud's name in their book, The Botany of Captain Beechey's Voyage.

Gaudichaud's name, Erythrina monosperma, was used by most of those who described the Hawaiian species of Erythrina throughout the nineteenth century, including William Hillebrand.

In 1932, Otto Degener created the name Erythrina sandwicensis to replace Erythrina monosperma. He stated no reason for the name change. He presented a more complete synonymy than the one given here. Erythrina sandwicensis is the name that has been used since 1932.

It is also a traditional Native Hawaiian saying “Pua ka wiliwili nanahu ka manō” which means "When the wiliwili blossoms, sharks bite." From the Kumulipo (a Kanaka Maoli creation story) is a proverb that means when the wiliwili bloom is that same time as sharks mating season and they are more aggressive.

=== Wiliwili hula chant ===
Auwe! Pau au i ka manō nui, e!
Lala-kea niho pa-kolu.
Pau ka papa-ku o Lono.
O ka ai ia e ka manō nui,
O Niuhi maka ahi,
Olapa i ke kai lipo.
Ahu e! au-we!
A pua ka wiliwili,
A nanahu ka manō
Auwe! pau ai i ka mano nui!
Kai uli, kai ele,
Kai popolohua o Kane.
A lealea au i kaʻu hula,
Pau au i ka manō nui!

Alas! I am seized by the shark, great shark!
Lala-kea with triple-banked teeth.
The stratum of Lono is gone,
Torn up by the monster shark,
Niuhi with fiery eyes,
That flamed in the deep blue sea.
Alas! and alas!
When the flowers of the wiliwili tree,
That is the time when the shark-god bites.
Alas! I am seized by the huge shark!
O blue sea, O dark sea,
Foam-mottled sea of Kane!
What pleasure I took in my dancing!
Alas! now consumed by the monster shark!
