= Schweitzer =

Schweitzer is a surname meaning "Swiss" in German. Notable people with the surname include:

- Albert Schweitzer (1875–1965), German theologian, musician, physician, and medical missionary, winner of the 1952 Nobel Peace Prize
- Alexander Schweitzer (politician) (born 1973), German politician
- Alexander M. Schweitzer (born 1964), German theologian
- Anton Schweitzer (1735–1787), German opera composer
- Brian Schweitzer (born 1955), American politician, former Governor of Montana
- Dahlia Schweitzer (born 1976), American pop culture critic and chair of the Film and Media program at the Fashion Institute of Technology
- Darrell Schweitzer (born 1952), American writer, editor and essayist
- Douglas Schweitzer, Canadian politician
- Edmund O. Schweitzer Jr., founder of E. O. Schweitzer Manufacturing
- Edmund O. Schweitzer III (born 1947), American electrical engineer, inventor
- George K. Schweitzer (1924–2024), American academic in chemistry and family history and local history
- Georgia Schweitzer (born 1979), American collegiate and professional basketball player
- Jean Baptista von Schweitzer (1833–1875), German politician and poet
- Jeff Schweitzer (born 1957), American non-fiction author, scientist and political commentator
- Johann Friedrich Schweitzer (1630–1709), Dutch-German alchemist
- Louis Schweitzer (philanthropist) (1899–1971), Russian-born American paper manufacturer
- Louis Schweitzer (CEO) (1942–2025), Swiss businessman, chairman and former CEO of Renault
- Mary Higby Schweitzer, American paleontologist
- Marlis Schweitzer (born 1975), Canadian theatre and performance historian
- Paul A. Schweitzer (born 1937), American mathematician
- Pierre-Paul Schweitzer (1912–1994), French businessman, managing director of the International Monetary Fund
- Scott Schweitzer (born 1971), American soccer coach and player
- Tyler Schweitzer (born 2000), American baseball player
- Wes Schweitzer (born 1993), American football player for the Washington Commanders
- Yoram Schweitzer, senior research fellow at Israel's Institute for National Security Studies

== See also ==
- Sweitzer (surname)
- Switzer (surname)
- Schweizer
- Schwyzer
