= Brett Chenoweth =

Australian business executive

- Education: University of Queensland (LLB, BEcon)
- Occupations: Business executive Company director
- Years active: 1990s–present
Title
APN News & Media	(Chief executive officer, 2011–2013)
Madman Entertainment	(Chairman, 2014–present)
Canberra Data Centres	(Chairman, 2016–present)
Tabcorp	(Chairman, 2024–present)

Brett Chenoweth is an Australian business executive and company director. He is the chairman of Tabcorp and Canberra Data Centres, and has held executive and board positions across the media, technology and telecommunications sectors.

== Early life and education ==
Chenoweth was born and raised in Queensland. He holds Bachelor of Laws and Bachelor of Economics degrees from the University of Queensland.

== Career ==
Chenoweth held senior roles at media and technology companies, including Telecom NZ, ecorp Ltd, ninemsn and Village Roadshow Pictures. Between 2001 and 2005, his roles at Telecom included Head of Group Strategy and Mergers & Acquisitions and Head of the Australian Consumer Group.

In 2006, Chenoweth was chief executive and founder of Australian technology start-up Gizmo, which launched a home-based technical support service in Sydney. The company also offered telephone support across Australia and planned to expand its home service nationally.

As of October 2010, Chenoweth was the managing director and head of Asia-Pacific of the New York-based merchant bank, the Silverfern Group. Before joining Silverfern, he was a co-founder of a boutique Australian direct investment firm, Cesura Partners.

In October 2010, Chenoweth was appointed chief executive officer of APN News & Media, succeeding Brendan Hopkins. He was expected to assume the role on 1 January 2011, after leaving The Silverfern Group.

In 2014, Chenoweth joined Madman management and a group of investors in acquiring the film distribution company from Funtastic. Following the acquisition, he was appointed chairman of Madman, while Tim Anderson and Paul Wiegard remained joint managing directors. In 2018, Chenoweth and his fellow Madman investors Adrian MacKenzie and Charbel Nader commissioned a review of the company, considering options including a sale or the entry of a new cornerstone investor.

In 2015, Chenoweth was appointed to the board of Surfing Australia. At the time, he was the chairman of the advisory board of H.R.L. Morrison & Co., and the managing director of HJB Limited. He was also a Principal of the Bombora Group, an investment firm Bombora Group which he co-founded with Mike Hill in the same year.

In January 2016, Chenoweth was appointed an independent director of eftpos Payments Australia, alongside Vickki McFadden. He joined the board as eftpos introduced its services into online, mobile and contactless platforms.

In October 2016, Chenoweth was appointed chairman of Canberra Data Centres following its acquisition by Infratil and Commonwealth Super Corporation. Founded by Greg Boorer in 2007, the company, also referred as CDC or CDC Data Centers, operates data centres in Australia and New Zealand.

In 2017, Chenoweth was appointed chairman of QUT Creative Enterprise Australia (CEA), which hosted Australia's first creative technology accelerator for early-stage companies. At the time, he also served as chairman of Yellow Pages Group, amongst others.

In 2022, Chenoweth joined the board of Tabcorp as a non-executive director, where he chaired the Risk, Compliance and Sustainability Committee.

In September 2024, Chenoweth was appointed chairman of Tabcorp, succeeding Bruce Akhurst at the end of 2024. At the time of his appointment, Chenoweth was chairman of CDC Data Centers, Adairs and RetireAustralia. He was also a director of EVT Limited and One New Zealand Group. In 2025, shareholders re-elected Chenoweth to the board.
