= Pollen Street Group =

British investment business

Pollen Street Group Limited
- Type: Public
- Traded as: LSE: POLN
- Industry: Financial services
- Founded: 2013
- Headquarters: London, England
- Key people: Lynn Fordham (Chairperson); Lindsey McMurray (CEO)
- Revenue: ▲£134.5 million (2025)
- Operating income: ▲£64.4 million (2025)
- Net income: ▲£56.6 million (2025)
- Website: www.pollenstreetgroup.com

Pollen Street Group Limited is a British private investment business focussed on alternative investments in the financial and business services sectors. It is listed on the London Stock Exchange and is a constituent of the FTSE 250 Index.

== History ==
Pollen Street Capital Holdings was founded by Lindsey McMurray and her team as an alternative investment manager spun out from Royal Bank of Scotland in 2013. It was the manager of Pollen Street Secured Lending under it was acquired by Waterfall Asset Management in March 2021. In February 2022, the company announced the launch of its fifth mid-market private equity fund with a cash requirement of c. £1 billion.

In September 2022, Pollen Street Capital Holdings was acquired by a listed vehicle, Honeycomb Investment Trust. Pollen Street Capital Holdings had been the manager of Honeycomb Investment Trust and the transaction enabled Pollen Street Capital Holdings to secure a listing on the London Stock Exchange. It also enabled Pollen Street Capital Holdings to use its extensive pipeline of loans to expand the investment trust. Honeycomb Investment Trust changed its name to Pollen Street in October 2022.

In January 2024, Pollen Street changed its listing category from that of an investment trust to that of a commercial business and renamed itself Pollen Street Group.

== Operations ==
The company had £7.1 billion of assets under management as at 31 December 2025.

== Portfolio companies ==
Major portfolio companies currently invested into by funds managed by Pollen Street include:

- Mattioli Woods
- Tandem Money
- Aryza
- The Markerstudy group
- Shawbrook Bank (alongside BC Partners)
