= ThinCats =

UK business lender

- Type: Ltd.
- Industry: Financial services Financial technology
- Founded: 2011; 15 years ago
- Headquarters: Birmingham, England, UK
- Area served: UK
- Key people: Amany Attia, CEO
- Products: Business loans
- Parent: Shawbrook Group plc
- Website: www.thincats.com

ThinCats is an alternative lender that provides business loans to mid-sized UK businesses using capital from institutional investors including pension schemes and asset managers. Founded in 2011, it operates throughout the UK with offices in Birmingham, Manchester and London.

== History ==
Thincats was launched in 2011 as one of the first peer-to-business lenders in the UK allowing individuals to lend money to limited companies. The firm was set up to help meet demand for funding generated largely by the withdrawal of the banks after the 2008 financial crisis.

In December 2015, ESF Capital (European Speciality Finance) Limited purchased a 73.4% equity stake in ThinCats. In December 2019, it announced that all future funding would be sourced from institutional investors only, letting its P2P platform go into administration.

In 2020 ThinCats was one of the first alternative lenders to be accredited by the British Business Bank to lend under the government backed Coronavirus Business Interruption Loan Scheme (CBILS) and Coronavirus Large Business Interruption Loan Scheme (CLBILS).

On September 30, 2025, Shawbrook Bank's parent company, Shawbrook Group plc, announced the completion of its acquisition of ThinCats.

== Business funding ==
ThinCats funds UK SMEs with loans from £1m up to £15m. It offers various funding solutions to meet a number of needs including working capital, refinancing, growth capital and acquisitions. A nationwide business development team was established in 2017 and works with accountants, corporate finance companies and other business advisers to structure debt facilities for businesses.

== Data ==
In 2018 ThinCats launched its data modelling system; PRISM (Propensity and Risk Model). This is used to help the business price risk and also looks to predict an SME’s future funding requirements.

== Investing ==
ThinCats enables institutional investors looking for income from an alternative asset class to lend directly to UK businesses.

Since 2017 ThinCats has announced a number of funding programmes and now manages mandates for a range of institutions, including Waterfall Asset Management, Insight Investment, BAE Systems Pensions and British Business Investments, funding commitments totalling in excess of £700m.
