= Mesirow =

Mesirow is a surname of Slavic origin, meaning "dweller on a row between ditches". Notable people with the surname include:

- Cameron Mesirow (born 1983), better known as Glasser, American singer, songwriter, and record producer
- Milton Mesirow (1899-1972), American jazz clarinetist and saxophonist

== See also ==
- Mesirow Financial, a financial services company based in Chicago, Illinois
