= Duranbah =

Duranbah may refer to:

- Duranbah, New South Wales, a town in Tweed Shire, NSW, Australia
- Duranbah Beach, a beach 12km from the town
