= Surfing in Australia =

- Country: Australia
- Governing body: Surfing Australia
- National team: Australia

National competitions
- Australian Open of Surfing

Club competitions
- Australian Boardriders Battle

International competitions
- World Surf League

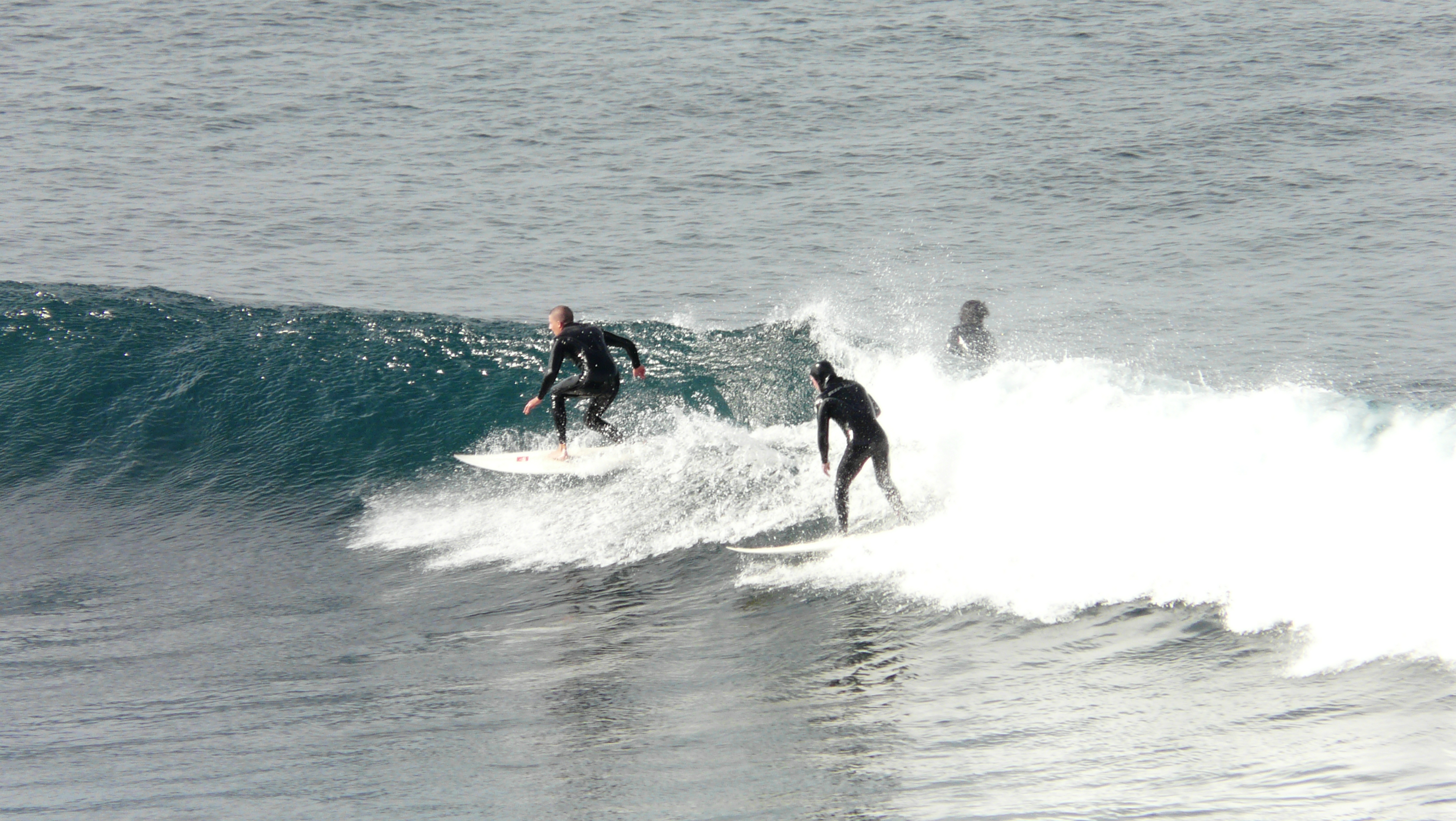
Bells Beach, Victoria surfers

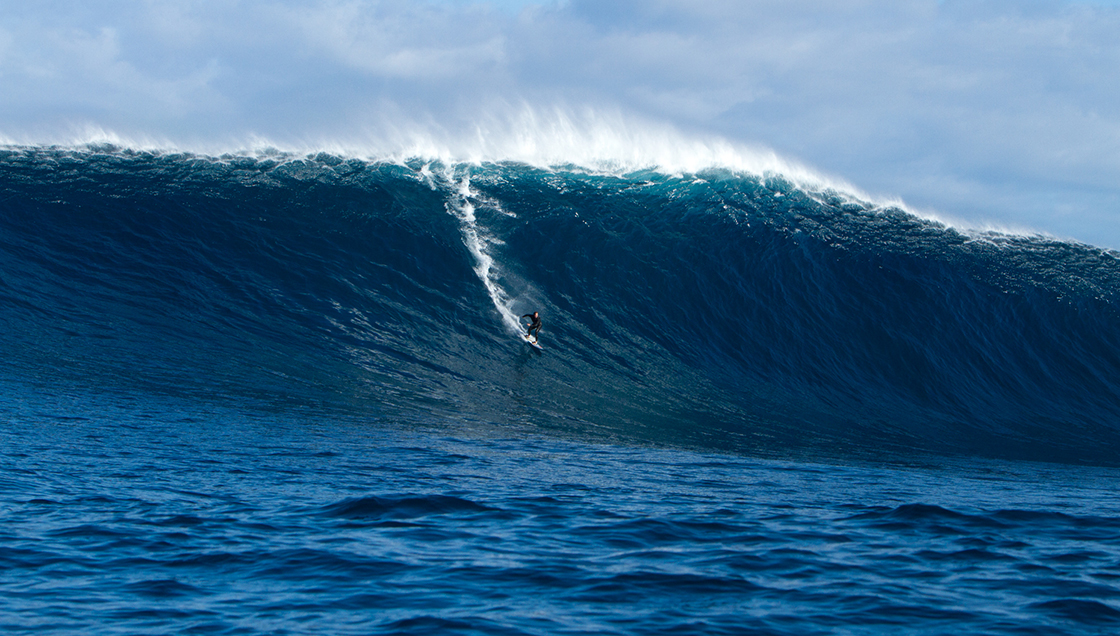
Mick Corbett riding Cowaramup Bombora, Western Australia, 2014

Australia is renowned as one of the world's premier surfing destinations. Surfing underpins an important part of the Australian coastal fabric, and forms part of a lifestyle in which millions participate and which millions more have an interest. For many years the sport was closely associated with the surf life saving movement in Australia. Australian surfboard-makers have driven innovation in surfboard design and production since the mid-1960s, and corporate giants Billabong, Rip Curl, and Quiksilver were established in Australia.

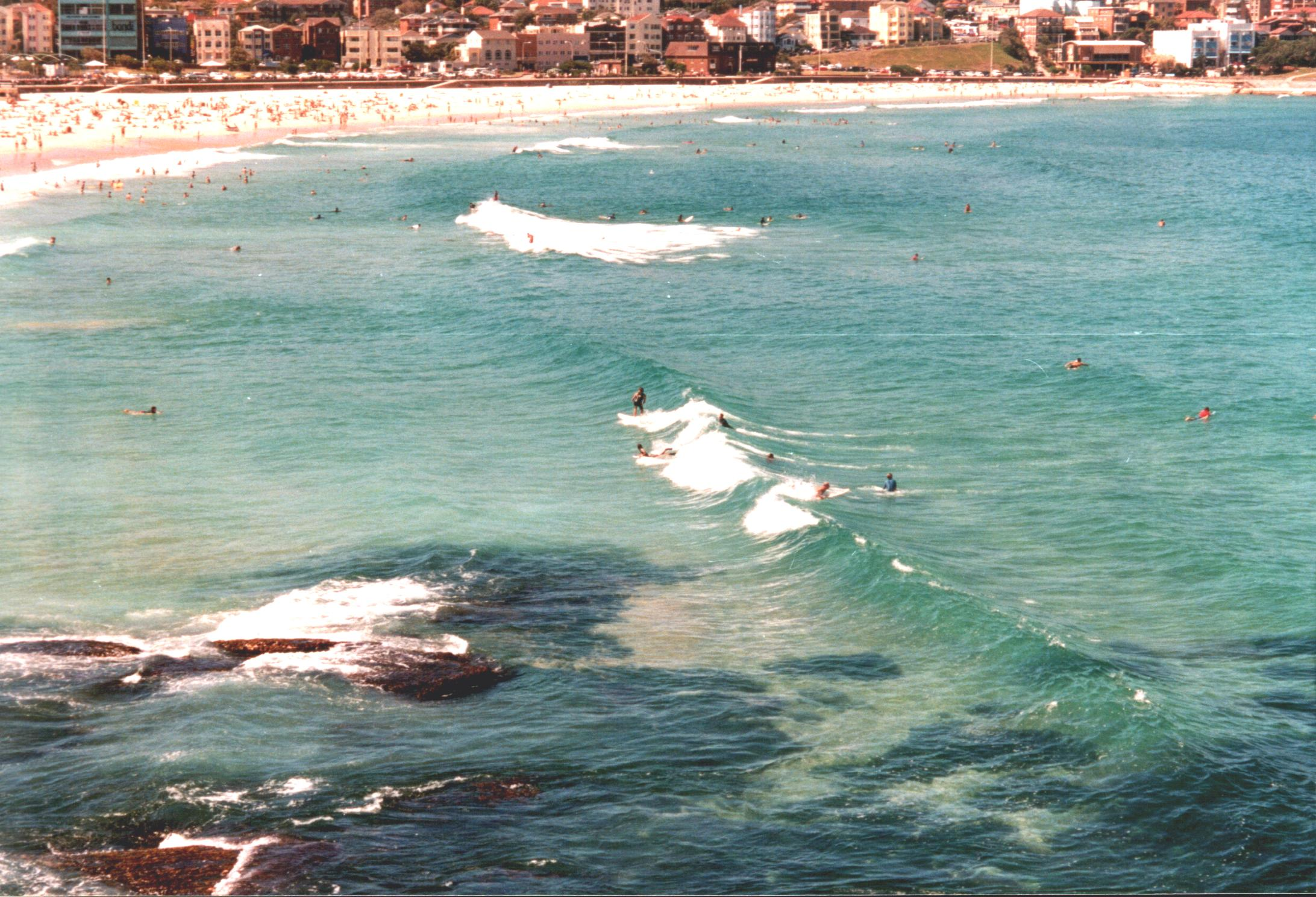
Bondi Beach surfers, 2000

== History ==
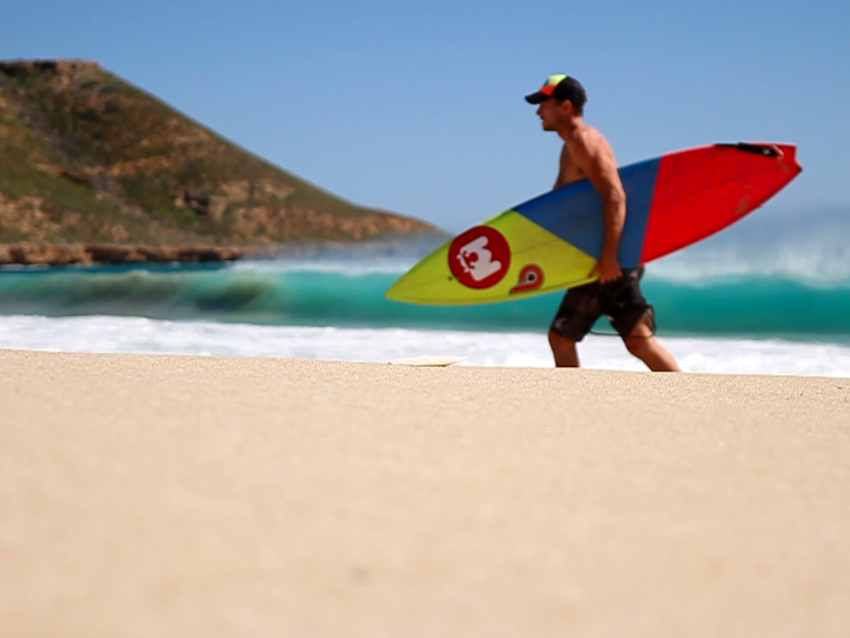
Jeff Rowley

Surfing was brought to Australia in 1915 by Hawaiian Duke Kahanamoku. He demonstrated this ancient Hawaiian board riding technique at Freshwater (or Harbord) in Sydney, New South Wales. Kahanamoku's board is now on display in the northeast end of the Freshwater Surf lifesaving club, Sydney, Australia.

In the 1950s, surfing was so popular that the Australian Government put laws in place in an attempt to curb surfing during working hours. The laws were removed after they resulted in more people surfing than usual.

In 1956, a team of lifeguards from the US introduced Malibu boards to Australia.

In the 1960s, Australian surfboard designer Bob McTavish invented the V-bottom surfboard, which is considered instrumental to the development of shortboard surfing.

Australia has produced many Association of Surfing Professionals (ASP) world champions, such as Wayne Bartholomew, Tom Carroll, Barton Lynch, Damien Hardman, Mark Occhilupo, Mick Fanning, Joel Parkinson, Stephanie Gilmore, Layne Beachley, Wendy Botha, Pauline Menczer, Chelsea Georgeson, Sally Fitzgibbons, and Mark Richards.

The World Surf League incorporates three major championship titles held in Australia: the Quiksilver Pro Gold Coast, Rip Curl Pro Bells Beach, and the Drug Aware Margaret River Pro.

One of the most successful Australian surfers, Mick Fanning, has won four titles at Bells Beach, Victoria, earning him the number one spot in the surfing ranks.

== Popular beaches ==
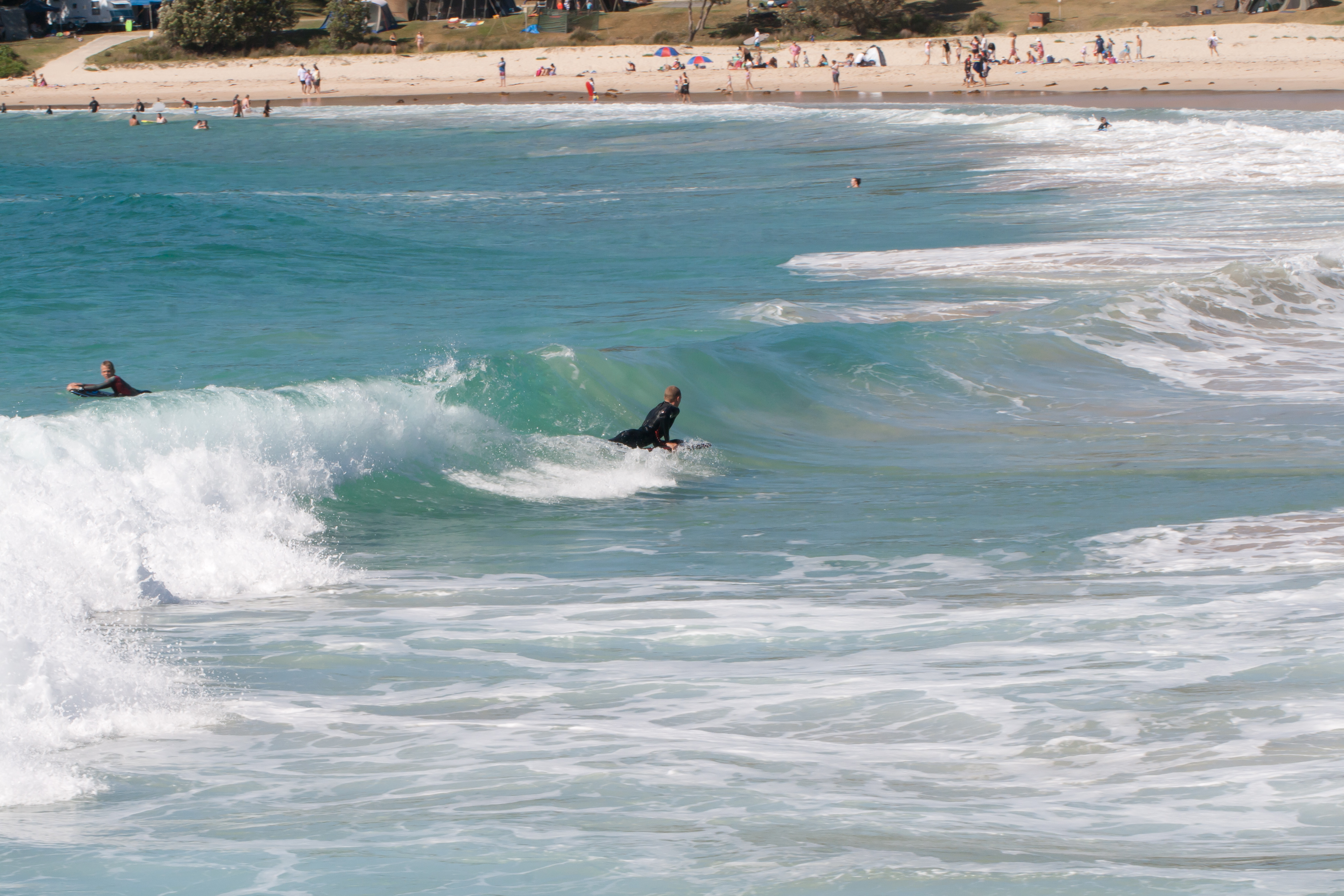
Merry Beach, New South Wales, 2013

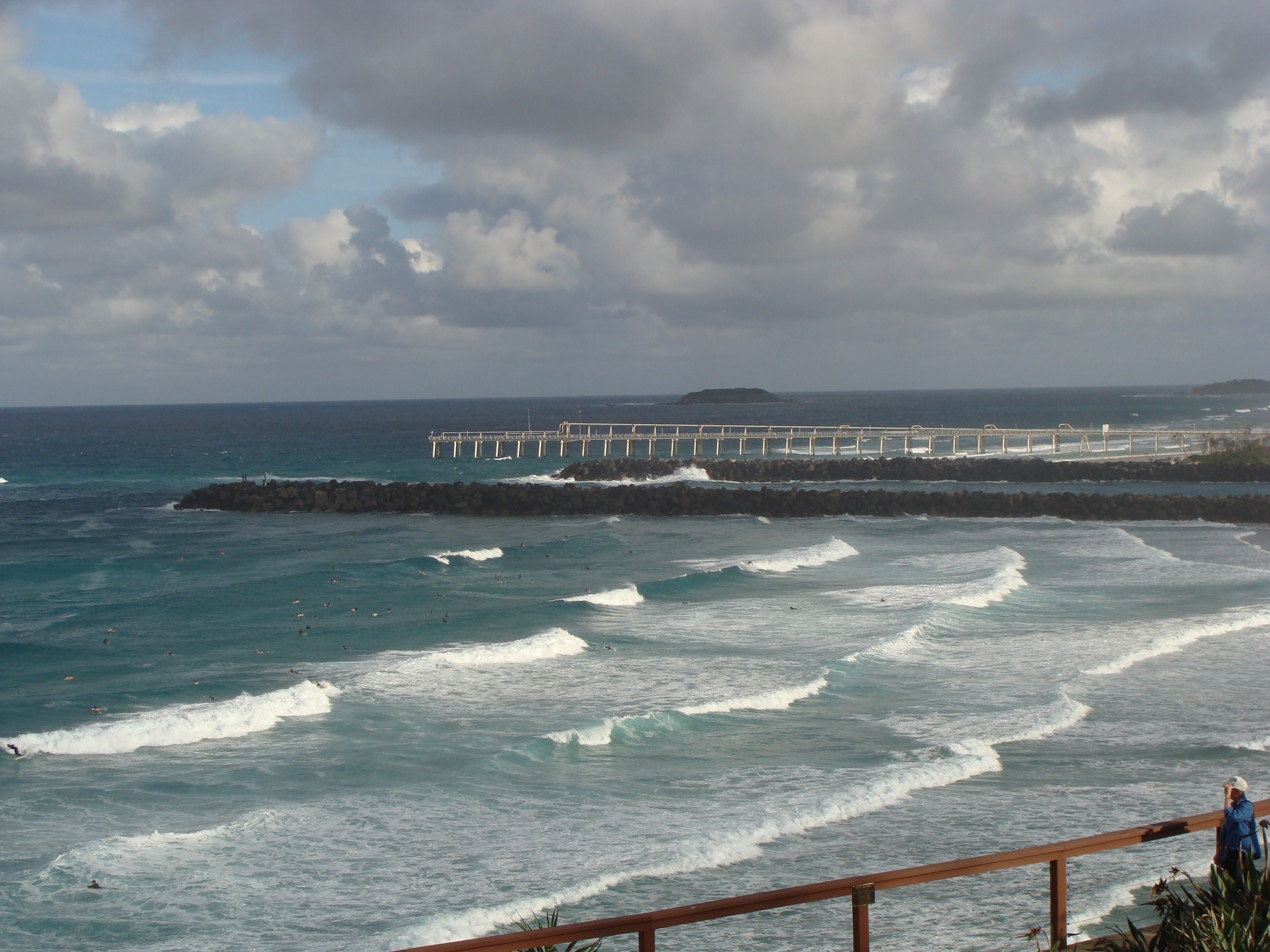
Duranbah Beach in northern New South Wales

Australia is renowned as one of the world's premier surfing destinations. There are many popular surfing beaches around the continent, including Noosa main beach and Snapper Rocks in Queensland, and Cape Woolamai in Victoria.

No surfing is possible in many parts of northern Australia due to coral reefs subduing waves. Modern surfboard design has been shaped by both Australian and Californian developments.

== Governing body ==
Surfing Australia is the national sporting body which guides and promotes the development of surfing.

== Culture ==
Surfing is a popular recreational sport around Australia, and a culture has grown alongside. The culture of surfing has grown dramatically from just being a relaxed way of living to a mainstream sport. The progression has led to research on the health benefits of surfing. The sport promotes cardiovascular fitness, muscular strength and balance. These physical benefits come from the constant paddling through the water, increasing arm and back strength whilst also increasing the heart rate. Surfing also gives one a chance to think and relax in an environment that decreases stress and relaxes the muscles.

== Brands ==
The country has launched corporate giants such as Billabong, Rip Curl, and Quiksilver.

== In film ==
Filmmakers Albe Falzon and Jolyon Hoff are known for their surfing documentaries. Hoff created the Surf Film Archive to preserve old deteriorating footage shot on celluloid film, by digitising it.

== Tournaments ==
Major Australian tournaments include the Men's Samsung Galaxy Championship Tour, Quiksilver Pro Gold Coast (Gold Coast, Queensland), Rip Curl Pro Bells Beach (Bells Beach, Victoria) and the Drug Aware Margaret River Pro (Margaret River, Western Australia). Other tournaments include the Australian Boardriders Battle, Australian Open of Surfing, Beachley Classic, Breaka Burleigh Pro and the Noosa Festival of Surfing.

== Australian World Title holders ==
=== Men ===
- 1977: Peter Townend
- 1978: Wayne Bartholomew
- 1979: Mark Richards
- 1980: Mark Richards
- 1981: Mark Richards
- 1982: Mark Richards
- 1983: Tom Carroll
- 1984: Tom Carroll
- 1987: Damien Hardman
- 1988: Barton Lynch
- 1991: Damien Hardman
- 1999: Mark Occhilupo
- 2007: Mick Fanning
- 2009: Mick Fanning
- 2012: Joel Parkinson
- 2013: Mick Fanning

=== Women ===
- 1989: Wendy Botha
- 1990: Pam Burridge
- 1991: Wendy Botha
- 1992: Wendy Botha
- 1993: Pauline Menczer
- 1998: Layne Beachley
- 1999: Layne Beachley
- 2000: Layne Beachley
- 2001: Layne Beachley
- 2002: Layne Beachley
- 2003: Layne Beachley
- 2005: Chelsea Georgeson
- 2006: Layne Beachley
- 2007: Stephanie Gilmore
- 2008: Stephanie Gilmore
- 2009: Stephanie Gilmore
- 2010: Stephanie Gilmore
- 2012: Stephanie Gilmore
- 2014: Stephanie Gilmore
- 2016: Tyler Wright
- 2017: Tyler Wright
- 2018: Stephanie Gilmore
- 2022: Stephanie Gilmore

== Australian surfboard shapers ==
Australia is a leading country in surfing and surfboard design. Shaping is an important part of the innovation and progression of surfing. Australian shapers include:

- Wayne Lynch (born 1951)
- Bob McTavish
- Maurice Cole
- Darren Handley, shaper to world champions Mick Fanning and Stephanie Gilmore
- Mark Richards (four times World Champion), who shaped his own boards during his time on the world tour.

== See also ==
- Australian National Surfing Museum
- Women's surfing in Australia
- Scott Dillon
