= Navigator Global Investments =

Australian investment management firm

Navigator Global Investments Limited
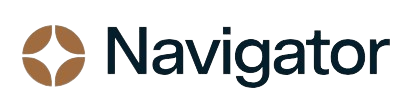

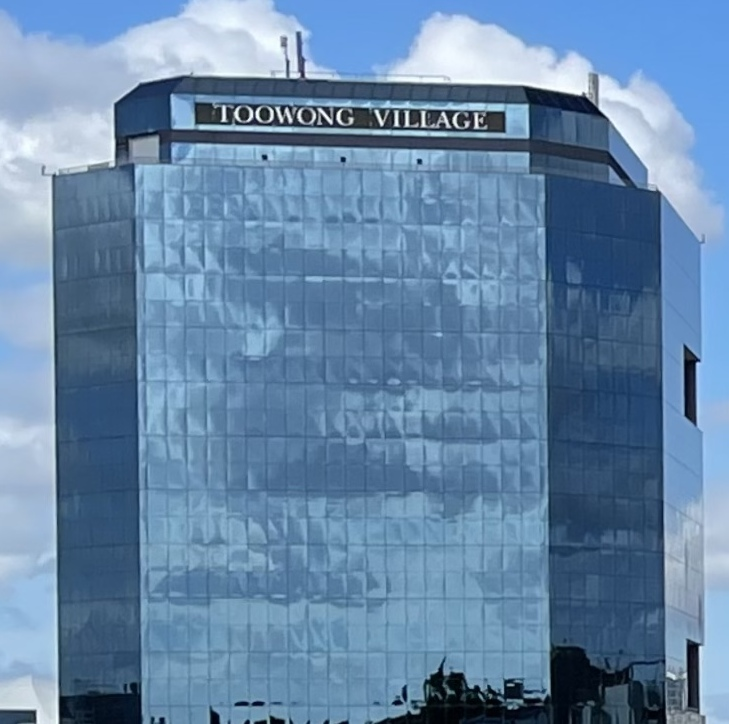
- Headquarters at Toowong Tower
- Formerly: HFA Holdings Limited
- Type: Public
- Traded as: ASX: NGI
- Industry: Investment management
- Founded: 1998; 28 years ago
- Founders: Spencer Young
- Headquarters: Toowong, Brisbane, Queensland, Australia
- Key people: Michael Shepherd (Chairman); Stephen Darke (CEO)
- Products: Alternative investments
- Revenue: ▲US$184.90 million (FY 2023)
- Operating income: ▼US$45.21 million (FY 2023)
- Net income: ▼US$35.51 million (FY 2023)
- AUM: US$26.10 billion (Dec 2023)
- Total assets: ▲US$762.93 million (FY 2023)
- Total equity: ▲US$421.84 million (FY 2023)
- Number of employees: ▲306 (Dec 2023)
- Website: navigatorglobal.com.au

Navigator Global Investments (NGI) is an Australian alternative investment management company headquartered in Toowong, Brisbane. It has been publicly traded on the Australian Securities Exchange (ASX) since 2006.

== Background ==
The company was originally founded in 1998 as HFA Holdings Limited (HFA) by Spencer Young.

In April 2006, HFA held its initial public offering to become a listed company on the ASX. Its listing price was A$1.10 per share. One of the companies that helped it list was MFS Limited which was also a cornerstone investor making it a significant shareholder.

In December 2006, Young stepped down from role of CEO of HFA to take a more strategic role and was succeeded by Paul Jensen. Jensen was only with the company until September 2007 when he was dismissed from his role with Young taking back charge of the company. Jensen would later sue HFA for unlawful dismissal seeking more than A$7.15 million in damages. HFA's counterclaim stated Jensen engaged in serious misconduct where he bought one of the company's funds outside the specific trading windows and also employed a personal consultant without the approval of HFA's board of directors.

In July 2007, HFA agreed to buy US-based Lighthouse Investment Partners (Lighthouse) for A$707 million.

After the 2008 financial crisis, HFA encountered significant difficulties. In December 2008, its share price was A$4.9 cents which was a decline of 98% since its peak in July 2007. At the same time, HFA had to distance itself from MFS Limited which was in the process of going bankrupt. HFA had also froze redemption for three of its unlisted investment funds after the bankruptcy of Lehman Brothers. There was speculation that HFA could have been forced to write-off A$604 million worth of intangible assets. By September 2009, HFA had written down 70% to 75% of goodwill related to its purchase of Lighthouse.

In April 2014, it was announced that Young would resign as his position as Chairman of HFA and end his involvement with the company. He was succeeded by Michael Shepard who took the role of chairman. HFA at the time was looking to appoint additional US-based independent non-executive directors.

On 9 August 2017, the board of HFA announced that the company's name would be changed from HFA to Navigator Global Investments. This was to signal that the company had completed its rebuilding and that it would aim to go beyond just hedge funds.

In June 2018, NGI had finalized its acquisition of Mesirow Advanced Strategies the multi-manager hedge fund division of Mesirow Financial.

In August 2020, NGI agreed to buy minority interest stakes in six alternative investment managers from Dyal Capital. They were Bardin Hill Investment Partners, Capstone Investment Advisors, Capital Fund Management, MKP Capital Management, Pinnacle Asset Management and Waterfall Asset Management. The deal was done in two parts with the second part being after 2025 where NGI will purchase the remainder of Dyal Capital's interest.

In September 2021, NGI signed a definitive agreement to acquire a 32 per cent ownership interest in Longreach Alternatives .

In April 2022, NGI looked to raise A$47 million via placement so it could acquire a 20% stake of US real estate manager Marble Capital. In August that year, NGI also acquired an interest in Invictus Capital Partners.

== Structure ==
NGI manages capital through eleven different alternative investment managers. They are:

- Bardin Hill Investment Partners (credit and event-driven investing)
- Capstone Investment Advisors (volatility arbitrage)
- Capital Fund Management (quantitative and systematic)
- GROW Investment Group (China-focused)
- Invictus Capital Partners (real estate)
- Lighthouse Investment Partners (fund of funds)
- Longreach Alternatives (general alternatives)
- Marble Capital (real estate)
- MKP Capital Management (global macro)
- Pinnacle Asset Management (commodities)
- Waterfall Asset Management (high-yield debt)

== See also ==
- Platinum Asset Management
