= Australian Boardriders Battle =

Surfing competition

Australian Boardriders Battle is an annual event held by Surfing Australia. Since 2017 the national competition finals have been hosted at Newcastle, New South Wales, generally in February each year. Fox Sports also airs the Australian Boardriders Battle live. The national finals of the first three series were held at Cronulla Beach in Sydney on the Australia Day weekend in late January.

== Series ==
Year	Series	Final venue	Naming sponsor	Prize money	Ref
2014	I	Cronulla Beach	Be the Influence	$100,000+	
2015	II	Cronulla Beach	Original Source	$120,000	
2016	III	Cronulla Beach	Original Source	$110,000	
2017	IV	Newcastle Beach	Original Source		
2018	V	Newcastle Beach	Nudie		
2019	VI	Newcastle Beach	Nudie		
2020	VII	Newcastle Beach	Nudie	$112,500	
2021	VIII	Newcastle Beach	Nudie	$112,700	
2022	IX	Newcastle Beach	Hyundai	$112,700	
2023	X	Newcastle Beach	Hyundai		
2024	XI	Burleigh Heads	Hyundai		

== Results ==
Year	Winner	Score	Runner-up	Score	Ref
2014	(Queensland) Snapper Rocks Surfriders Club	3780	(New South Wales) Elouera Boardriders Club	3250	
2015	(Queensland) Snapper Rocks Surfriders Club	5525	(New South Wales) Coffs Harbour Boardriders Club	4800	
2016	(New South Wales) North Narrabeen Boardriders	35.67	(Queensland) Point Lookout Boardriders	30.37	
2017	(New South Wales) Avoca Boardriders	35.40	(Queensland) Snapper Rocks Surfriders Club	31.95	
2018	(New South Wales) Culburra Beach Boardriders Club	31.05	(New South Wales) Merewether Surfboard Club	30.10	
2019	(New South Wales) Merewether Surfboard Club	36.00	(New South Wales) North Shelly Boardriders Club	32.00	
2020	(Queensland) North Shore Boardriders Club	38.70	(New South Wales) North Shelly Boardriders Club	36.75	
2021	(New South Wales) North Narrabeen Boardriders	35.05	(Queensland) Snapper Rocks Surfriders Club	30.79	
2022	(New South Wales) North Shelly Boardriders Club	31.21	(Queensland) Snapper Rocks Surfriders Club	21.91	
2023	(New South Wales) Byron Bay Boardriders Club	31.83	(Queensland) Snapper Rocks Surfriders Club	31.21	
2024	(Queensland) Burleigh Heads Boardriders Club	41.25	(New South Wales) North Shelly Boardriders Club	33.17	

== Results by year (top clubs) ==
=== 2014 ===
- (Queensland) Snapper Rocks Surfriders (QLD) 3780
- (New South Wales) Elouera Boardriders (NSW) 3250
- (New South Wales) Merewether Surfboard Club (NSW) 3020
- (New South Wales) Queenscliff Boardriders (NSW) 2870
- (Western Australia) Yallingup Boardriders (WA) 2860
- (New South Wales) North Narrabeen Boardriders (NSW) 2660
- (South Australia) Seaford Boardriders (SA) 2650
- (Queensland) Kirra Surfriders (QLD) 2550
- (New South Wales) Werri Boardriders (NSW) 2490
- (New South Wales) Avoca Boardriders (NSW) 2470
- (New South Wales) Cronulla Sharks Boardriders (NSW) 2450
- (Victoria (state)) Torquay Boardriders (VIC) 2350
- (Victoria (state)) 13th Beach Boardriders (VIC) 2150
- (Queensland) Dbah Boardriders (NSW) 2150
- (Western Australia) Margaret River Boardriders (WA) 2150
- (Tasmania) South Arm Boardriders (TAS) 2050

=== 2015 ===
1. Snapper Rocks Boardriders, 5525
2. Coffs Harbour Boardriders, 4800
3. Culburra Boardriders, 4262
4. North Narrabeen, 4250
5. Avoca Boardriders, 4174
6. Merewether Surfboard Club, 4062
7. Point Lookout Boardriders, 4050
8. Bondi Boardriders, 3862
9. Byron Bay Boardriders, 3851
10. Le Ba Boardriders, 3850
11. Scarborough Boardriders, 3762
12. Margaret River Boardriders, 3750
13. Kirra Surfriders, 3674
14. South Coast Boardriders, 3550
15. Cronulla Sharks Boardriders, 3362
16. Philip Island Boardriders, 3162
17. Peninsula Surfriders, 3063
18. Burleigh Boardriders, 3062
19. Coolum Boardriders, 2750
20. South Arm Boardriders, 2550

== See also ==
- Surfing in Australia
