= Point Danger (Tweed Heads) =

Headland at Coolangatta, Queensland, Australia

- Headland
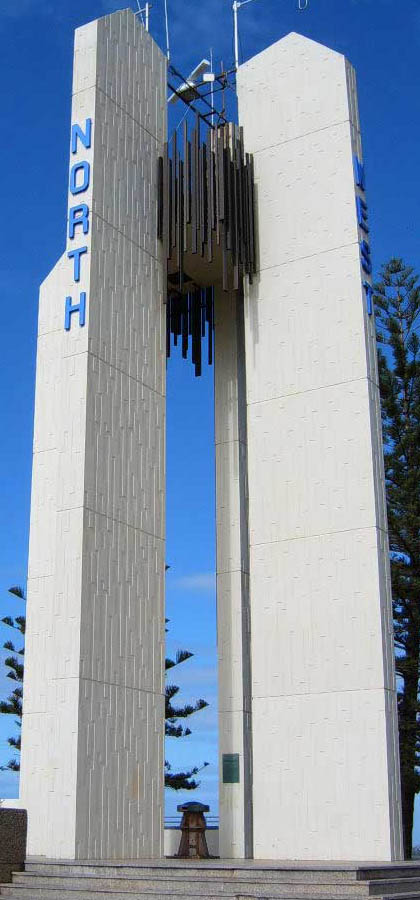
- Point Danger lighthouse

- Coordinates: 28°10′00″S 153°33′00″E
- Location: Coolangatta, Queensland; Tweed Heads, New South Wales
- Offshore water bodies: Coral Sea

Point Danger is a headland, located at Coolangatta on the southern end of the Gold Coast on the east coast of Australia. Separated by Snapper Rocks and Rainbow Bay to the west, with Duranbah Beach and the Tweed River mouth to the south, present-day Point Danger has also indicated the border between New South Wales and Queensland, Australia, since 1863.

The point is the location of the Captain Cook memorial and lighthouse, the Centaur Memorial and Walk of Remembrance, the Marine Rescue NSW Point Danger station, and the southern end of the Gold Coast Oceanway.

The Centaur Memorial remembers the sinking of Australian Hospital Ship Centaur by a Japanese submarine on 14 May 1943. The Walk of Remembrance commemorates other ships lost to Japanese and German action during World War II and takes the form of plaques arranged in a semicircle around the lookout fence.

== History ==
Captain James Cook, upon encountering the eastern Australian coast and naming Ram Head, today's Rame Head (Victoria), then sailed up the coast to the famous Botany Bay. Continuing North from there, at about 5 pm on 16 May 1770 (log date) he encountered the reefs that run 3 nautical miles (5.6 km; 3.5 mi) east from Fingal Head and Cook Island. To avoid these reefs, formed by a lava flow from Mount Warning, Cook was forced to change his course to the east. Cook's log indicates his ship was "about 5 miles from the land". However having to pull away to the east to avoid the reefs, that we now know only run 3 nautical miles (5.6 km; 3.5 mi) to sea from Cook Island, would indicate Cook was much closer to Fingal Head the point he named Point Danger.

The next morning, (same log date 16 May) James Cook, although much further out to sea, recorded the location of the reefs and named the point off which the island and reefs lie – Point Danger. He wrote:

We now saw the breakers again they lay two Leagues from a point under which is a small Island, their situation may always be found by the peaked mountain before mentioned from them this mountain or hill, and on this account I have named Mount Warning it lies 7 or 8 Leagues inland the land is high and hilly about it, but it is conspicuous enough to be distinguished from everything else. The point off which these shoals lay I have named Point Danger.

These reefs are now named Danger Reefs and comprise Inner Reef, South Reef and Outer Reef.

There has been controversy over the naming of Point Danger for many years. It seems the controversy began as early as 1823, when government surveyor, John Oxley, set out in HMCS Mermaid to explore Port Curtis, the site of Gladstone. Oxley explored Moreton Bay, which had been named by Captain Cook, and the Brisbane River, as well as exploring and naming the Tweed River. It was during this voyage that Oxley encountered what is now known as Fingal Head and reported it as being Point Danger, so named by Captain James Cook. Oxley's favourable report on the Brisbane River saw him return the following year and establish the colony of Brisbane under the direction of Sir Thomas Brisbane, Governor of New South Wales in 1824.

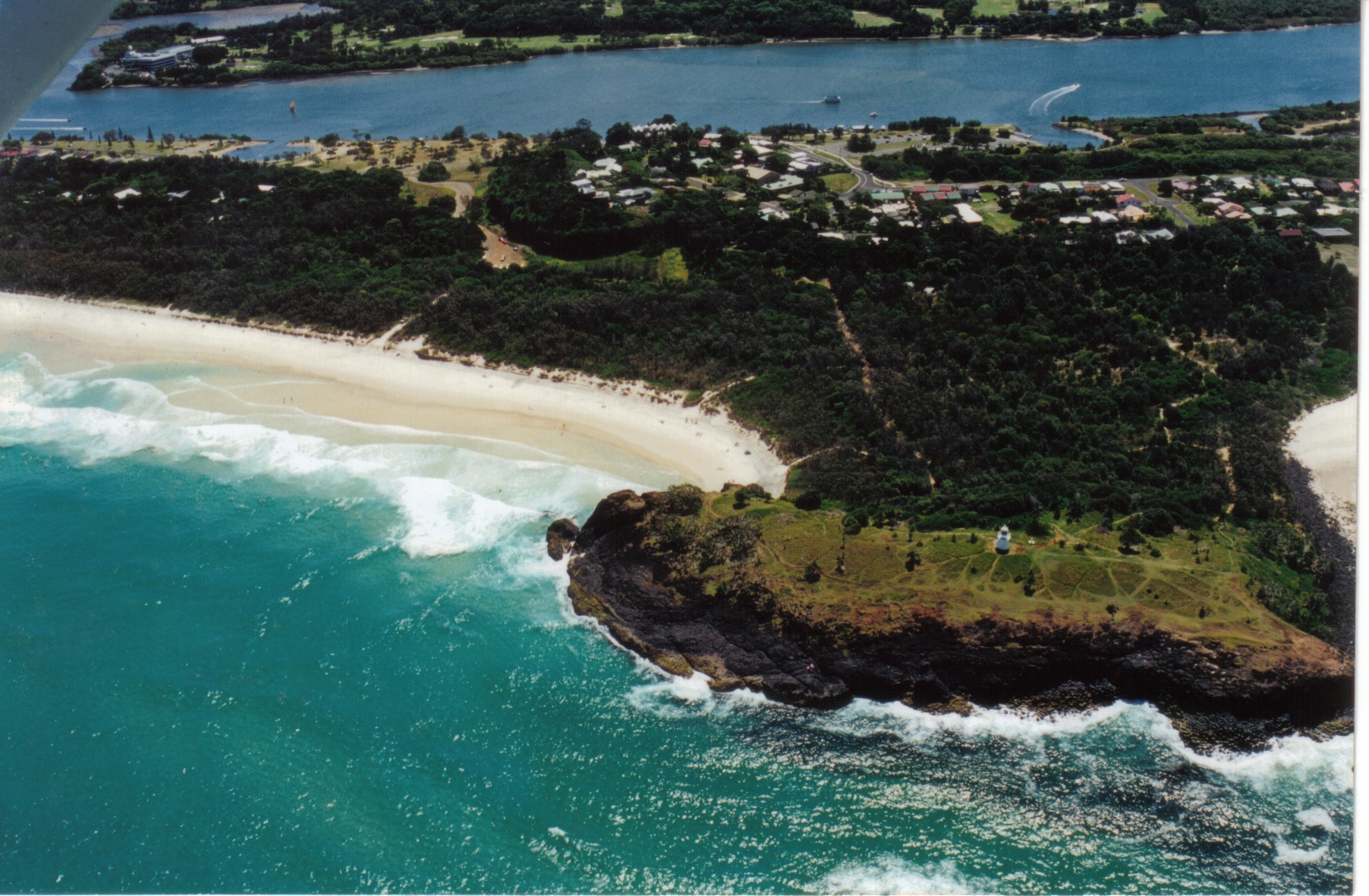
Fingal Head

At some time in 1828 Henry John Rous, travelling north, charted the Tweed River, which he named the Clarence River, unaware that it had already been named the Tweed River by Oxley in 1823. Rous came up the eastern coastline and around the reef off the coast of the feature now known Fingal Head, and arrived at a place now called Rainbow Bay, so named after his ship. It was there that Henry Rous has arguably caused all of the confusion. He named the, at the time, unnamed site of Point Danger as being that of Cook's Point Danger.

There was further confusion as to the location of Cook's Point Danger when in 1840 surveyor Robert Dixon was given the task of doing the first land survey of the area. Dixon's role was to map the New South Wales and Queensland border. He was told to map the border from the west to Point Danger on the east coast. Dixon took the location of Cook's Point Danger as being that of the one identified by Rous in 1828 rather than the one identified by Oxley in 1823.

In 1970, on the 200th anniversary of Cook's naming of Point Danger and given that the location seemed to be correct, a memorial was placed at the current site and the New South Wales, Queensland and Federal governments combined to erect the Point Danger Captain Cook Memorial Lighthouse. However, in 1971, the following year, after much debate about the location of Cook's Point Danger and the Queensland-New South Wales border, the Geographical Names Board declared:

little doubt exists that the feature named Point Danger by Captain Cook was in actual fact the feature now known as Fingal Head. However, as the name has been known in its present position for over 130 years and having in mind the wording of the letters Patent of 6 June 1859, in which the position of the QLD-New South Wales border is linked with the position of Point Danger, the Board is not prepared to assign the name to any feature or position other than that to which it is currently located.

The misnaming obviously raised a significant constitutional issue. Yet despite this pronouncement, some 18 years later debate was still continuing. In November 1989 the Geographical Names Board approved a historical re-enactment of Cook's voyage. The research for the re-enactment led to Acting Chief Surveyor Ron Benjamin finding that:

From the re-enactment voyage, I now have no doubt that Captain Cook's, 'point of land under which lies a small island', was intended to be today's Fingal Head.

However, in 1998, following another review, the New South Wales Geographic Names Board, it was concluded, in part:

From an analysis of Cook’s Private Log, the Official Log of the 'Endeavour', Cook’s Journal and the journals of Cook’s Officers, and relating the analysis to modern nautical charts and maps of the area, it is suggested that the following conclusions be drawn:

5. It is the opinion of the Geographic Names Board Committee therefore that the present Point Danger is correctly designated.

The matter did not finish there however. Many were unhappy with a conclusion that appeared to be so at odds with the historical facts and agitation continued. Trevor Lipscombe, in closely tracking Cook's voyage and ground-truthing the places he named, concluded in On Austral Shores (2005), that:

There can be little doubt that Fingal Head is Cook's Point Danger

In 2007, at Ken Gold's behest, Dr Nigel Erskine of the Australian National Maritime Museum reviewed the argument put forward by the Geographic Names Board. As a result of Gold's representations, and support from a number of authorities, Mr Chris Hartcher was able to rise and inform the Parliament of New South Wales on 9 April 2008:

that today the Geographical Names Board has considered Mr Gold's efforts and announced that the official records for Point Danger and Fingal Head will be changed to reflect both the historical versions of the naming of Cook's Point Danger.

== Lighthouse ==
The lighthouse/Cook Memorial was finished in 1971. It is an unusual modern style lighthouse and was the first in the world to experiment with lasers to increase its beam. The experiment was unsuccessful and it returned to conventional electric lamps. It emits a double white flash every ten seconds at a focal plane height of 44.5 metres. However, there are no reefs off, or running East from this point. The light is operated by Transport for NSW.
