= Lighthouse Investment Partners =

Investment management firm based in Florida

Lighthouse Investment Partners, LLC
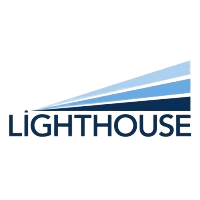
- Type: Subsidiary
- Industry: Investment Management
- Founded: 1999; 27 years ago
- Founder: Sean McGould
- Headquarters: Palm Beach Gardens, Florida, U.S.
- Key people: Sean McGould (CEO & CIO)
- Products: Alternative investments Fund of hedge funds
- AUM: US$16.1 billion (February 2025)
- Owner: Navigator Global Investments
- Number of employees: 540 (February 2025)
- Website: www.lighthousepartners.com

Lighthouse Investment Partners (Lighthouse) is an American alternative investment management firm based in Palm Beach Gardens, Florida. The firm mainly takes a fund of funds approach that invests indirectly through other specialized investment managers.

Outside the U.S., Lighthouse has offices in London, Hong Kong and Dubai.

== Background ==
In 1996, Sean McGould who previously worked for Trout Trading became CIO of family office, Asset Management Advisors (now part of Truist Financial) where he managed a multi-manager investment fund. In 1998, McGould decided to go independent and the fund was spun-off to become an independent entity named Lighthouse Investment Partners and was based in Palm Beach Gardens, Florida. In 1999, it started accepting external client money to become a hedge fund and offered managed account products. Originally capital was mainly from high-net-worth individuals but after the stock market downturn of 2002, institutional investors became more interested in Lighthouse to hedge risks.

In November 2007, HFA Holdings (now Navigator Global Investments) announced it would acquire Lighthouse in a deal worth US$676.3 million although Lighthouse would continue to operate independently under its own name. Under the deal terms, HFA paid Lighthouse as well as SunTrust Banks who had a 25% stake in Lighthouse for ownership.

In December 2010, Apollo Global Management made a $75 million convertible note investment to acquire a 40% stake in Lighthouse from HFA. Under the terms of the deal, Lighthouse would continue to operate independently under its own name while Apollo would distribute Lighthouse's fund of funds strategies to its clients. According to McGould, Lighthouse was not looking for a deal but the offer from Apollo was too good to pass up. In January 2014. Apollo stated it would sell its investment in Lighthouse due to various factors which included disagreements over strategy and disappointment with Lighthouse's performance. On June 26, 2014, HFA announced it would buy back Apollo's convertible note investment making it once again the sole owner of Lighthouse.

In March 2018, Lighthouse agreed to acquire Mesirow Advanced Strategies, the multi-manager hedge fund business of Mesirow Financial.

It was reported that Lighthouse pulled its capital from DeepBlue Asset Management a few weeks before its strategy paid off in March 2020. DeepBlue, a volatility arbitrage hedge fund was seeded with $150 million from Lighthouse. In late February 2020, its assets declined by over 10% in a few days and by mid-March, Lighthouse ordered it to be liquidated. However had Lighthouse let the fund continue, the payoff could have neared $750 million due to the 2020 stock market crash. Lighthouse did not notify its clients on the missed opportunity as it had no legal obligation to do so.

Lighthouse and Saba Capital Management had invested in Digital World Acquisition Corp. which they sold in October 2021 after news had emerged the company was merging with Donald Trump's new media venture. Shares of the company had surged 357%.

In January 2025, Lighthouse and Fortress Investment Group agreed to merge their global multistrategy hedge funds.

== Structure ==
Lighthouse has four external investment managers that it manages capital through. They are:

- North Rock Capital (relative value equities)
- Mission Crest Capital (global macro)
- Pier61 (climate risk)
- Penglai Peak (Japan equities)

In addition Lighthouse has two of its own strategies, Global Equities and Opportunistic.
