= Octaviar =

Octaviar Limited
- Type: Public (ASX: OCV)
- Industry: Finance
- Founded: 1999
- Defunct: 2009
- Fate: Bankrupted
- Headquarters: Southport, Queensland, Australia
- Key people: Andrew Peacock, Chairman
- Website: www.mfsgroup.com.au

Octaviar Limited (formerly called MFS Limited) was an Australian diversified investment company in the funds management and financial services sectors. The company, once valued at $2.4 billion was forced to sell its main asset, the Stella Group, in February 2008 and in March 2008 the value of the company had fallen to just $480 million.

As of August 1, 2009, the company is in liquidation. The company was delisted from the Australian Stock Exchange on 31 August 2009 after failing to pay listing fees.

== History ==
- 1999: McLaughlins Financial Services Limited, founded by Michael King, receives ASIC AFSL 227010
- June, 2000: Acquires Noosa Junction Shopping Centre
- November, 2000: Launches MFS Premium Income Fund
- July, 2001: Acquires MFS Leveraged Investment and Securities Trust
- 2002: MFS subsidiary, McLaughlins Financial Services Limited acquires over A$250 million of real estate assets
- 2003: MFS subsidiary, McLaughlins Financial Services Limited, acquires property at Queen Street, Melbourne and retail premises of Louis Vuitton at the intersection of Collins and Russell Streets.
- March, 2004: MFS subsidiary, McLaughlins Financial Services Limited, acquires a number of homemaker centres in Queensland and New South Wales.
- May, 2004: Acquires the AAE group of companies, which owns and operates the Victorian ski field businesses at Mount Hotham and Falls Creek
- September, 2004: Acquired approximately 18.5% of the ASX listed BreakFree Limited.
- October, 2004: MFS Premium Income Fund was sized at approximately $440 million
- January, 2005: Re-lists a restructured MFS group on the Australian Stock Exchange (ASX) and announces merger with BreakFree Limited.
- February, 2005: reaches 50.1% interest in BreakFree Limited
- March 2005: acquire luxury accommodation group Peppers Leisure Limited and the Sheraton Mirage Resorts located on the Gold Coast and Port Douglas.
- April 2005: BreakFree expands into Queenstown
- May 2005: Completed BreakFree Limited merger
- June 2005: HFA Asset Management announces the closure of its HFA Octane Fund Series Two which attracted over $90 million in investments.
- July 2005: MFS wins the 2005 Hotel Investor of the Year Award for the Sheraton Mirage Resorts
- September 2005: MFS subsidiary, McLaughlins Financial Services Limited is appointed the Responsible Entity for the PH Sydney Hotel Trust and the Challenger Howard Property Trust. The major asset of the Trusts is the Park Hyatt Hotel on Sydney Harbour.
- October 2005: MFS launches a golf industry investment fund in conjunction with its title sponsorship of the 2005 MFS Australian Open.
- February 2006: The MFS Living and Leisure Trust (MPY) announced that it has acquired the Melbourne-based Oceanis Group, the world’s largest aquarium owner and operator.
- January 2008: A proposal to the market is announced whereby MFS' financial services and tourism arms are to be split. This proposal is not well received by the market, following which the company's share price falls significantly, its shares are temporarily suspended from the ASX and the CEO resigns.
- April 2008: The head company, MFS Ltd, is renamed Octaviar Limited.
- August 2008: The MFS Living and Leisure Trust (MPY) now called Living and Leisure Australia (asx: LLA) was recapitalised and refinanced under a $236m rescue deal put together by Charbel Nader of Pitt capital Partners and involving the James Packer controlled Arctic Capital.
- September 2008: After a proposal to major creditors fails to get acceptance the Directors appoint voluntary administrators to the group with the aim of trying to reach an accommodation with the majority of creditors through a Deed of Company Arrangement.
- August, 2009: Octaviar Limited is placed in liquidation.
- November, 2009: The Australian Securities and Investments Commission commences an action against former directors for misappropriating $130 million allegedly sourced from the Premium Income Fund of which MFS Investment Management Limited was the responsible entity.

== Assets ==
MFS owns:

- MFS Funds Management Group
- Structured Finance Solutions
- HFA Funds Management Group

MFS manages:

- MFS Diversified Group now GEO Property Group
- MFS Living & Leisure Group now Living & Leisure Australia
