= Radix Trading =

Proprietary trading firm

Radix Trading, LLC
- Type: Private
- Industry: Financial services
- Founded: 2012; 14 years ago
- Founders: Benjamin Blander; Michael Rauchman
- Headquarters: 353 North Clark, Chicago, Illinois, U.S.
- Products: Proprietary trading Algorithmic trading High-frequency trading
- Website: www.radixtrading.co

Radix Trading is an American proprietary trading firm headquartered in Chicago. It has additional offices in New York and Amsterdam.

== Background ==
Radix Trading was co-founded by Benjamin Blander and Michael Rauchman. Blander was previously head of the high-frequency trading group of Citadel LLC while Rauchman was the chief technology officer of GETCO.

In August 2017, Radix Trading opened an office in Amsterdam to expand its operations into Europe. Amsterdam was selected over London for several reasons, one of which being it having regulatory advantages compared to London due to Brexit.

On March 27, 2023, the Commodity Futures Trading Commission (CFTC) filed a lawsuit against Binance and Changpeng Zhao in the United States District Court for the Northern District of Illinois, claiming willful evasion of US law and allegedly breaching derivatives rules. In the lawsuit, three unidentified trading firms were cited as "VIP" clients of Binance although they were not accused of wrongdoing. Radix Trading self-identified that it was 'Trading Firm A' through an article in The Wall Street Journal. The others were later identified as Jane Street Capital and Tower Research Capital. According to the CFTC, Binance instructed Radix Trading to access its website through a virtual private network. Blander told The Wall Street Journal, that while Radix Trading traded on Binance for several years via offshore affiliates and a prime brokerage, he believed it had not done anything wrong. This was because anything related to cryptocurrency connectivity was legally vetted beforehand. He also stated the firm was cooperating with the CFTC regarding its investigation.
