= Garage (TV channel) =

- Country: New Zealand
- Broadcast area: New Zealand

Programming
- Language: English
- Picture format: 576i (SDTV)

Ownership
- Owner: Garage Entertainment Aust Pty Limited (Madman Entertainment)

History
- Launched: 15 May 2015
- Closed: 31 July 2017 (2 years, 77 days)
- Replaced by: Garage Entertainment (Online VOD)

Links
- Website: www.garage.com.au

Garage was a New Zealand 24-hour linear subscription television channel dedicated to action and adventure sports programming on the Sky TV platform.

== History ==
On 4 May 2015, it was announced that Garage would replace Juice TV on Sky TV effective 15 May 2015.

15 November 2015 the channel owner Garage Entertainment Aust Pty Ltd was acquired by SurfStitch Group Limited. SurfStich in the acquisition statement displayed their ambitions to expand the Garage TV channel to Australia and Asian markets.

In April 2017, Madman Media Group announced it had purchased Garage Entertainment from SurfStitch Group for "a nominal cash consideration".

The channel closed on 31 July 2017 at 23:59. The brand continued to be used by Madman as a monthly streaming service revolving around extreme sports for a while, until it was eventually repurposed into a streaming service that holds Garage's library of movies.

In September 2026, Garage's app was merged into DocPlay.
