= Madman Entertainment =

Australian entertainment company

Madman Entertainment Pty. Ltd.
- Type: Private
- Industry: Entertainment
- Founded: 4 August 1996; 30 years ago
- Founders: Tim Anderson; Paul Wiegard
- Headquarters: East Melbourne, Victoria, Australia
- Area served: Australia and United States
- Key people: Brett Chenoweth (chairman); Paul Wiegard (CEO); Adrian MacKenzie
- Products: Cinema; DVD; Blu-ray; Digital Video; Video on demand
- Owner: Five V Capital
- Number of employees: 90 (2022)
- Divisions: Third Man Films
- Subsidiaries: DocPlay; Garage Entertainment; Madman Interactive
- Website: www.madman.com.au

Madman Entertainment Pty. Ltd., also known as Madman Films, stylised as MADMAN, is an Australian film and television production, distribution, entertainment, and rights management company. Headquartered in East Melbourne, Victoria, the company specialises in feature films, documentaries, and television series, across theatrical and home entertainment formats in both Australia and the United States.

== History ==
=== Early history ===
Madman Entertainment was founded in 1996 by Tim Anderson and Paul Wiegard as a mail order business specialising in imported anime titles, after following the success of Manga Entertainment in the United States and the United Kingdom. The Australian branch of Manga Entertainment was absorbed into Madman Entertainment in the late 1990s. Originally selling titles on VHS, the company became the second Australian distributor to author DVDs in-house, with the 1995 film Ghost in the Shell being their first DVD release. In 1998, Madman began distributing anime to television outlets, with Neon Genesis Evangelion airing on SBS TV.

Madman manages the distribution of live-action titles through its labels Madman Films, Directors Suite, Madman Sports, Madman Laughs, Madman Television, Bollywood Masala and Eastern Eye as well as children's entertainment through its Planet Mad and Mad4Kids labels. Madman also has a theatrical distribution arm called Madman Cinema. In addition, the company distributes programmes acquired or produced by Australia's Special Broadcasting Service (and newly, titles from WWE in Australasia, thus replacing Shock Entertainment) on DVD and Blu-ray. Until 2005, Madman was also the distributor for film distributor Umbrella Entertainment.

=== Acquisition by Funtastic Limited ===
On 1 May 2006, Madman Group was purchased by Funtastic Limited for A$34.5 million, in order to acquire the media rights to titles for which Funtastic held the toy rights. Madman founders Tim Anderson and Paul Wiegard also signed an employment agreement upon the acquisition, remaining on Madman's board of directors.

In 2007, Madman began a licensing agreement to release original Cartoon Network and Adult Swim series on DVD in Australia and United States. Madman also programmed Adult Swim's anime block in the two countries until Cartoon Network Australia dropped its entire Adult Swim lineup on 1 January 2008.

On 23 February 2008, Madman announced that it had reached a distribution deal with Viz Media to distribute Viz Media's manga titles in Australia and United States. The distribution deal ended in April 2016, with Simon & Schuster taking over distribution of Viz's catalogue, and Madman Entertainment ceasing distribution of all manga titles.

At the 2008 Supanova Pop Culture Expo, Madman announced plans to explore new distribution methods. Madman launched the Madman Screening Room, a video on demand streaming service, with School Rumble being the first title on the platform. Madman also began releasing Blu-ray Disc titles, starting with The Transformers: The Movie in June 2009. On 1 June 2009, Madman Entertainment produced an English adaption of Tamagotchi: The Movie, a 2007 film based on the Tamagotchi digital pets from Bandai and WiZ. Madman also intended to dub the film's sequel, Tamagotchi: Happiest Story in the Universe!, but the dub was cancelled for unknown reasons.

In April 2008, the company announced a collaboration with British company Warp Films. Warp and Madman plan to make "at least two films together over the next three years, starting with Tyrannosaur."

=== Independent company ===
On 4 March 2014, Funtastic Limited announced its intention to sell Madman Entertainment due to Madman's market value being half of its carrying value. On 31 July 2014, original founders Tim Anderson and Paul Wiegard, along with a small group of investors, purchased Madman Entertainment from Funtastic for A$21 million.

In April 2017, Madman Media Group announced it had purchased Garage Entertainment from SurfStitch Group for "a nominal cash consideration", acquiring Garage Entertainment Pty. Ltd. and TMG Media Pty. Ltd., with Madman and SurfStitch agreeing to negotiate a strategic partnership for content development and advertising services.

=== Sale of Madman Anime Group and further film development ===
On 17 February 2018, Madman co-founder & CEO Tim Anderson confirmed that on 15 November 2017, Sony Music Entertainment Japan subsidiary Aniplex had become a minority shareholder in Madman's anime business, Madman Anime Group, and was issued an undisclosed number of shares.

On 23 May 2018, it was revealed that investors Adrian MacKenzie, Brett Chenoweth, and Charbel Nader were examining options to sell the Madman Media business, or bring in another investor, after PwC Australia conducted a strategic review, with Madman being valued around A$50 million.

On 6 February 2019, Madman Entertainment sold Madman Anime to Aniplex for A$35 million.

On 13 February 2020, it was announced that Madman Entertainment, Curzon, and Cinéart partnered to launch a US$1.6 million film development fund for three years. The partnership provides the companies first look options for distribution, and is expected to back 16 projects. The Curzon CM Development Fund is operated from Curzon's London offices, and its first projects include Swimming Home, Sweet Maddie Stone, and The Ballad of a Small Player.

On 11 July 2023, APRA AMCOS filed a lawsuit against Madman streaming services DocPlay and Garage Entertainment, claiming the two services had failed to pay for licences for the use of music on platforms' titles. This proceedings settled swiftly with DocPlay and Garage becoming among the first streaming services to reach agreement with APRA AMCOS for the ongoing payment of music fees.

== DocPlay ==
DocPlay
- Website type: Subscription video on demand
- Available in: English
- Area served: Australia, United States, United Kingdom
- Owner: Madman Entertainment
- Website: docplay.com
- Registration: Required
- Launched: 1 December 2016; 9 years ago
- Current status: Active

DocPlay is a video-on-demand streaming service dedicated to streaming documentaries. The serviced was launched by Madman Entertainment on 1 December 2016 as a subscription-only service, and included 130 documentary titles, with 20 Australian titles.

On 29 November 2016, it was announced that Madman Entertainment were the recipients of Screen Australia's Enterprise funding program, with Madman launching DocPlay to allow for a revenue-sharing model for filmmakers of documentaries on the platform. The funding also allowed for DocPlay to acquire and stream Australian documentaries on the service.

On 23 July 2019, DocPlay reached a content agreement with ABC Commercial to expand DocPlay's content by adding 180 hours of factual content from ABC's library onto the service. The deal included locally produced content, as well as content from United States and the United Kingdom.
