= Rainbow Bay =

Australian beach and bay area

Coordinates: 28.1628°S 153.547°E

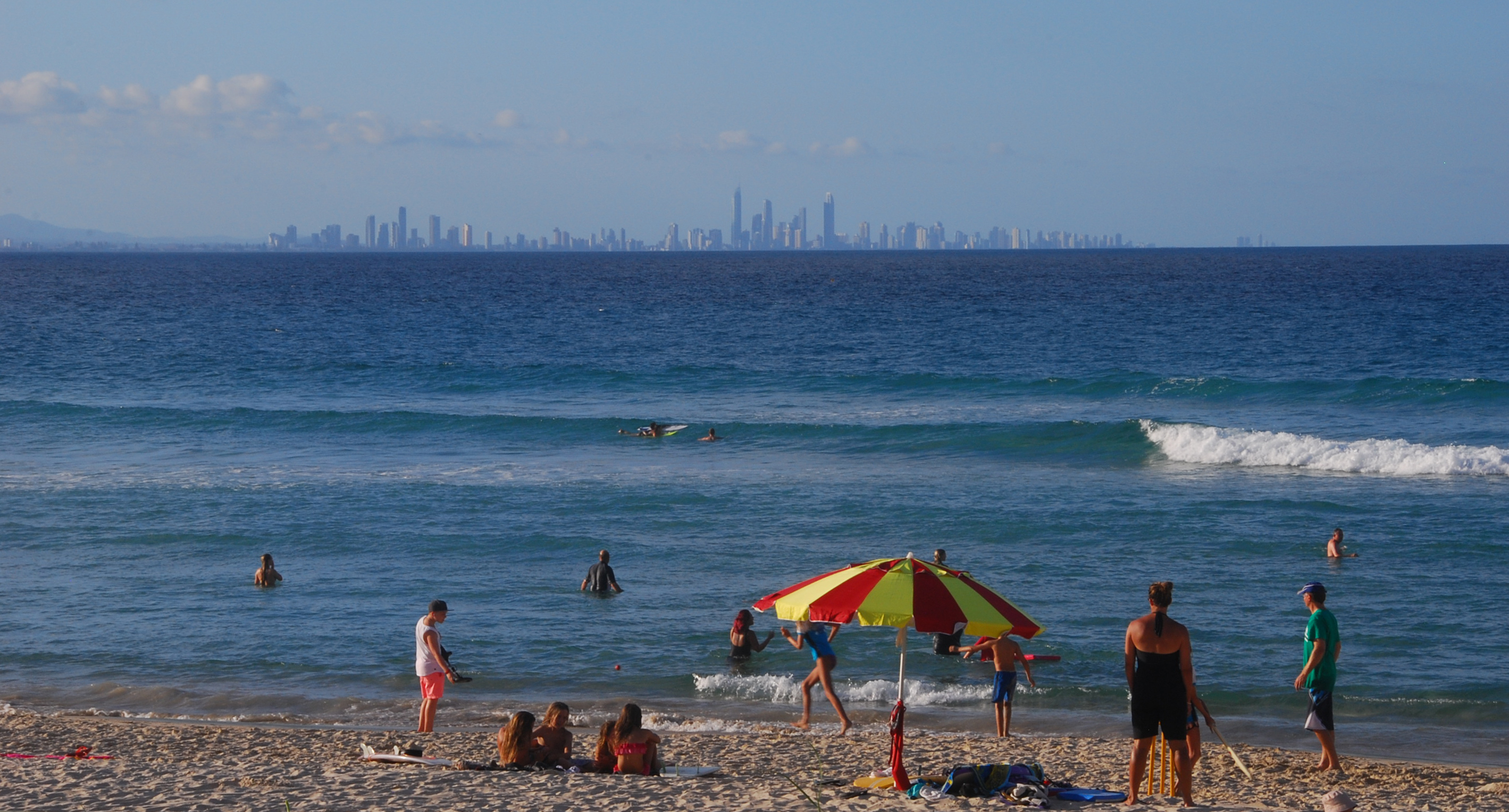
Rainbow Bay beach with the Gold Coast city skyline in the distance.

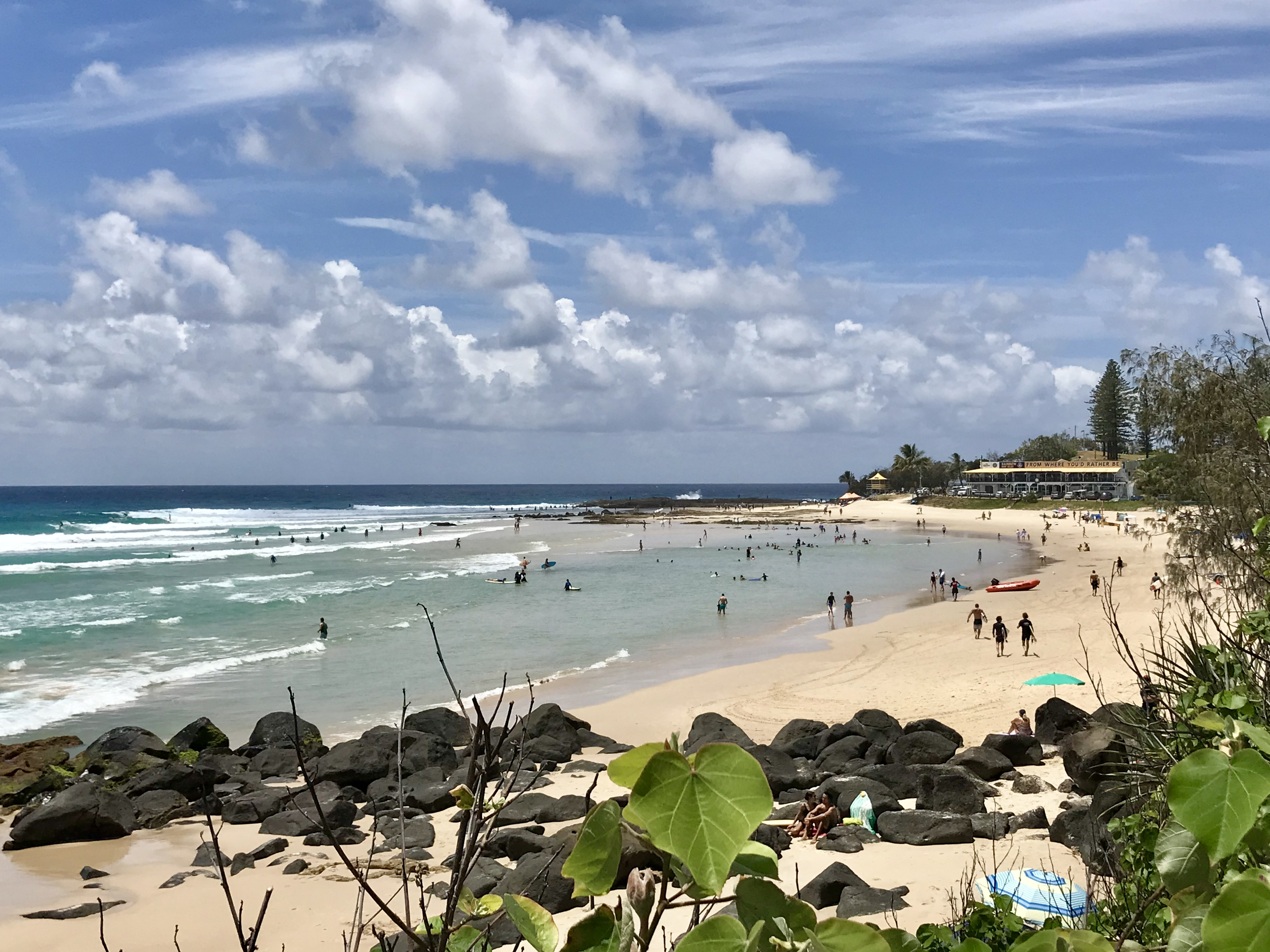
View from Greenmount Hill across Rainbow Bay to Snapper Rocks, 2018

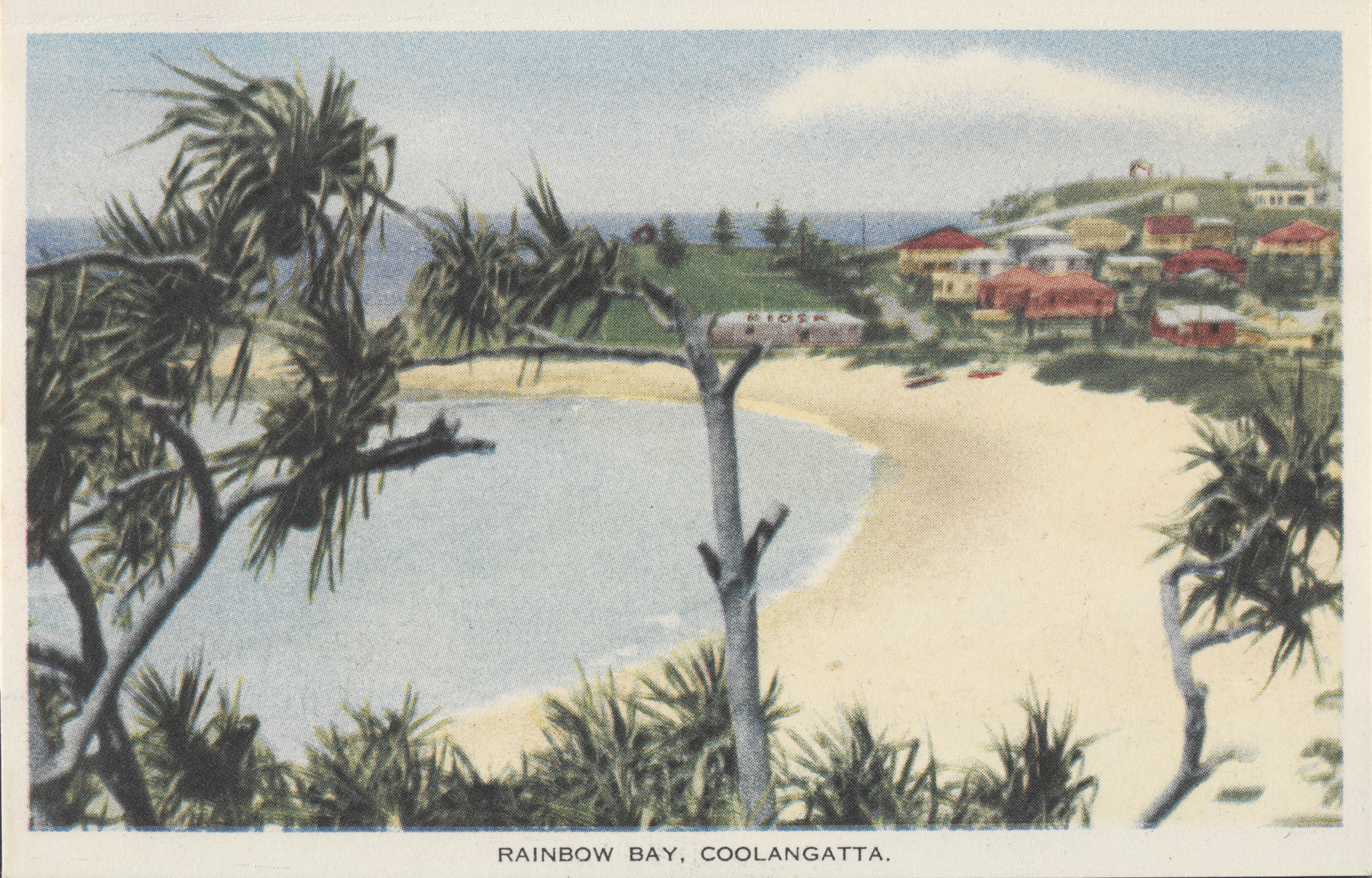
View from Greenmount Hill across Rainbow Bay to Snapper Rocks, circa 1950

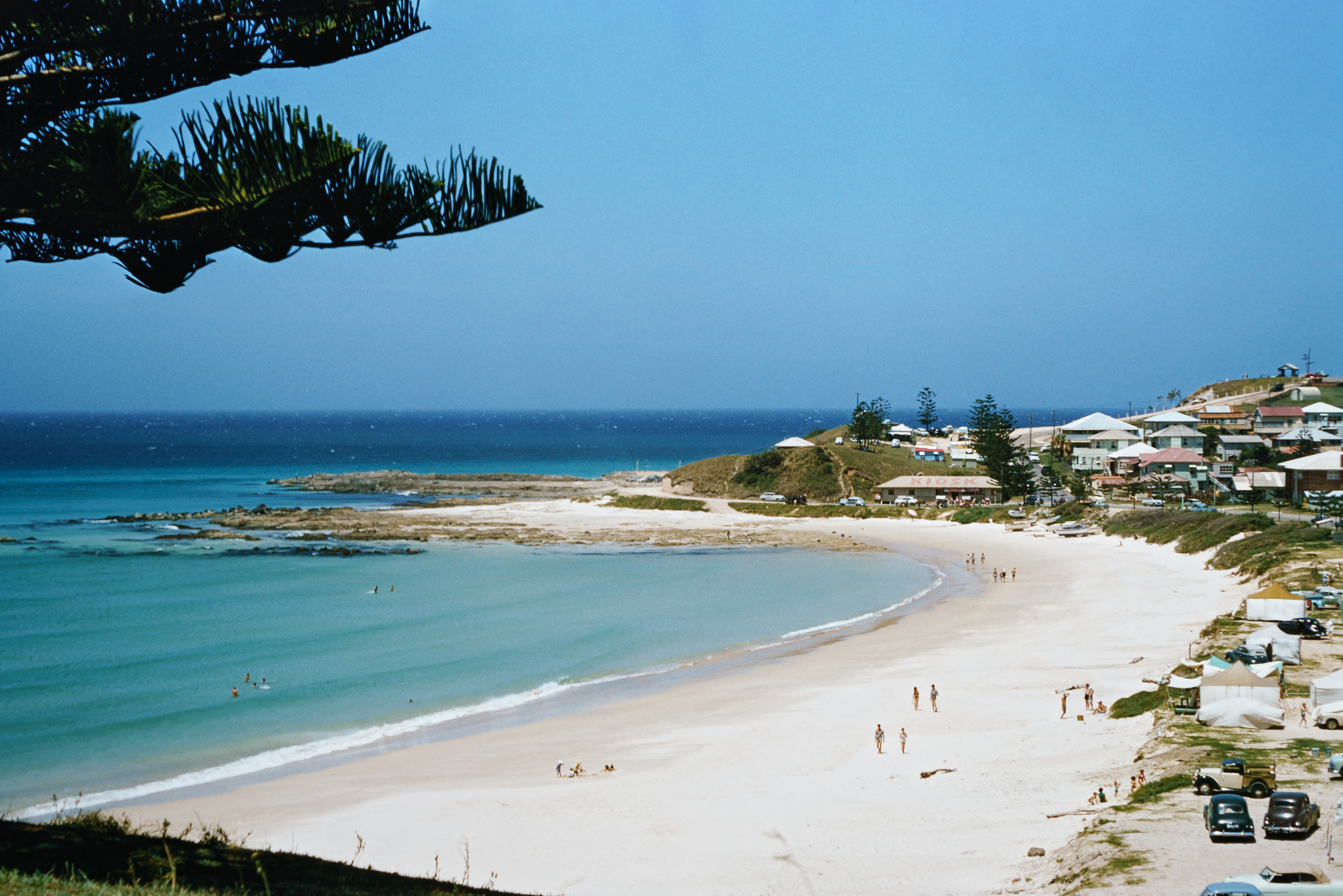
Rainbow Bay and Point Danger, December 1956

Rainbow Bay is a bay, beach and locality at the southern end of Coolangatta within the City of Gold Coast, Queensland, Australia.

== History ==
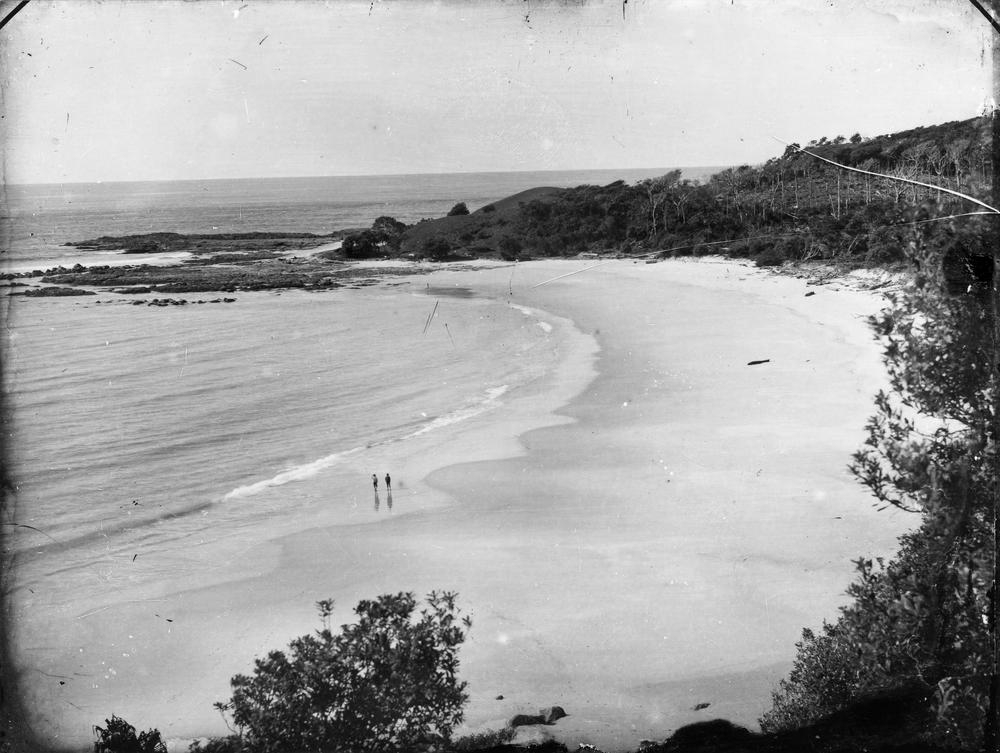
View from Greenmount Hill across Rainbow Bay to Snapper Rocks, circa 1891

The bay was originally but unofficially known as Shark/Sharks Bay. In 1925, the Point Danger Progress Association requested the Coolangatta Town Council to change the name to Rainbow Bay, which the council approved at its meeting on 31 May 1925. It is believed that this was the name originally given to the bay by Captain Henry John Rous, who surveyed the Point Danger area in 1828 in HMS Rainbow, a sixth-rate frigate. In August 1925, the council erected directional signs to Rainbow Bay. Rainbow Bay is one of the most popular beaches on the Gold Coast. The beach attracts surfers going to nearby Snapper Rocks and Greenmount Beach because of the spectacular waves, as the beach is included as part of the Superbank. The beach is also popular with families who flock to the sheltered beach because of the safety and lack of rips.

== Amenities ==
Rainbow Bay is home to Rainbow Bay Surf Lifesaving Club near Snapper Rocks.

== See also ==
- Snapper Rocks
