= 353 North Clark =

Office skyscraper in Chicago, Illinois

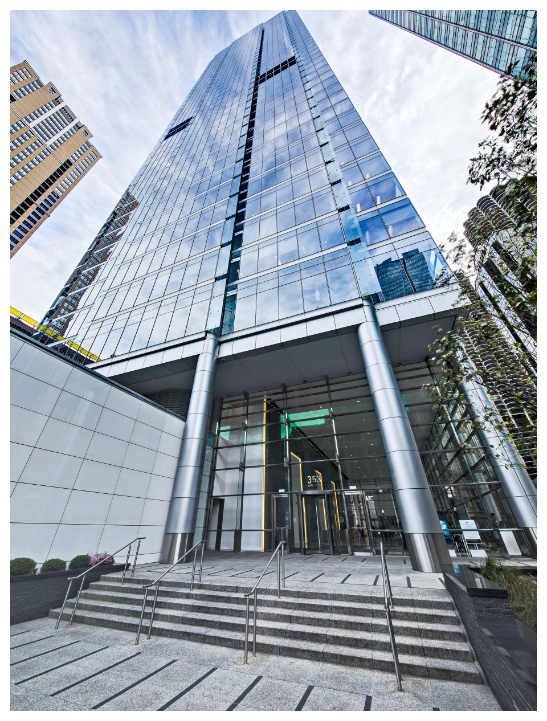
- Interactive map of the 353 North Clark area

General information
- Status: Completed
- Type: Office
- Location: 353 North Clark Street, Chicago, Illinois
- Coordinates: 41.888924°N 87.630153°W
- Construction started: 2007

Height
- Roof: 624 ft (190 m)

Technical details
- Floor count: 45
- Floor area: 1,173,643 sq ft (109,035 m^{2})
- Lifts/elevators: 22

Design and construction
- Architect: Dirk Lohan of Lohan Anderson

353 North Clark is a 624-foot (190 m) tall skyscraper in Chicago, Illinois. The building began construction in 2007 and was completed in 2009. It has 45 floors with a total of 1,173,643 square feet (109,035 m^{2}) of floorspace. In 2014, Empire, a TV series created for FOX, began filming in its lobby.

== Tenants ==
- Jenner & Block
- Intercontinental Exchange
- Mesirow Financial
- Radix Trading

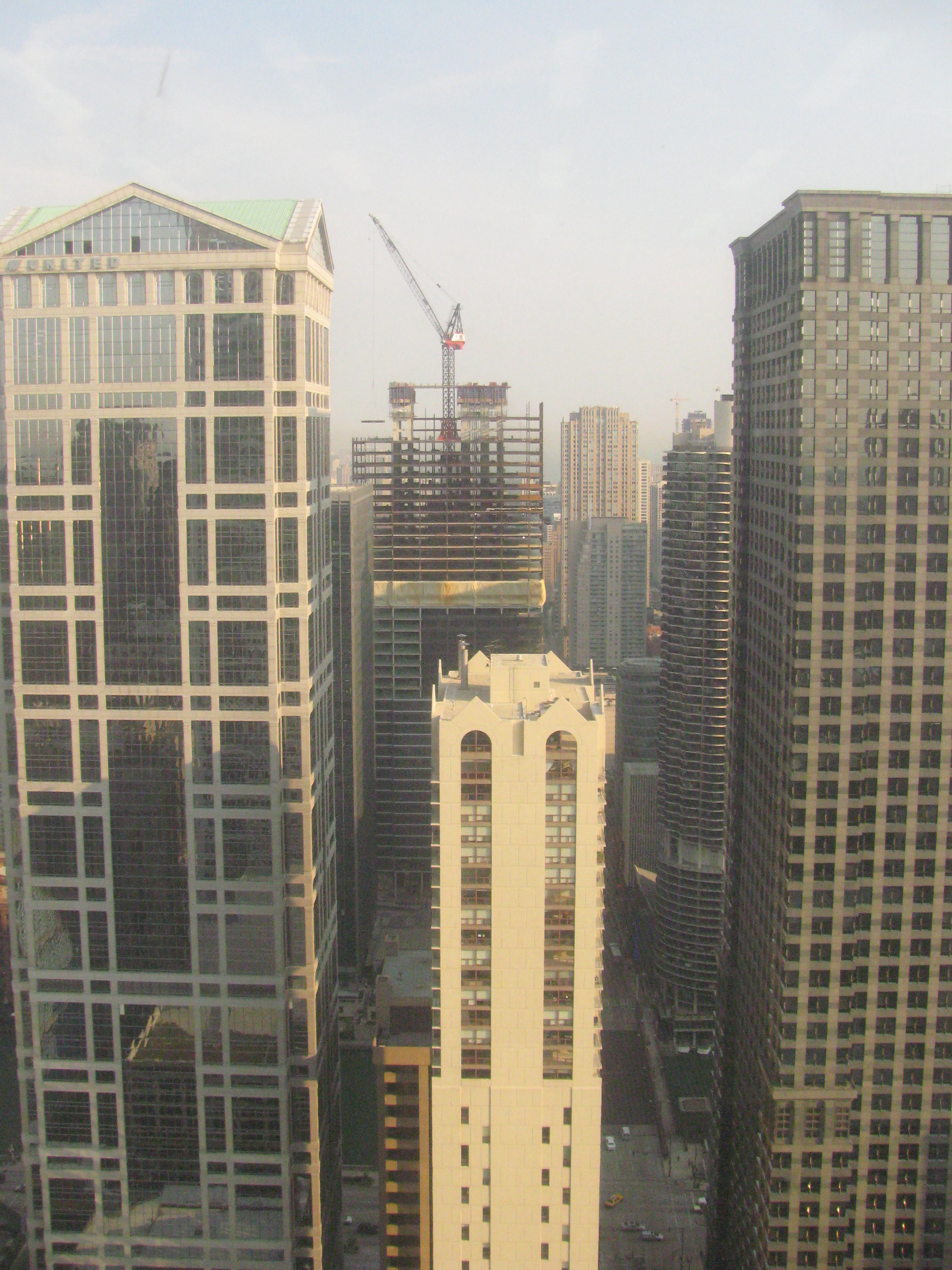
353 North Clark under construction

== See also ==
- List of tallest buildings in Chicago
