= Greenmount Beach =

Beach in Gold Coast, Queensland, Australia

Coordinates: 28°10′01″S 153°32′36″E

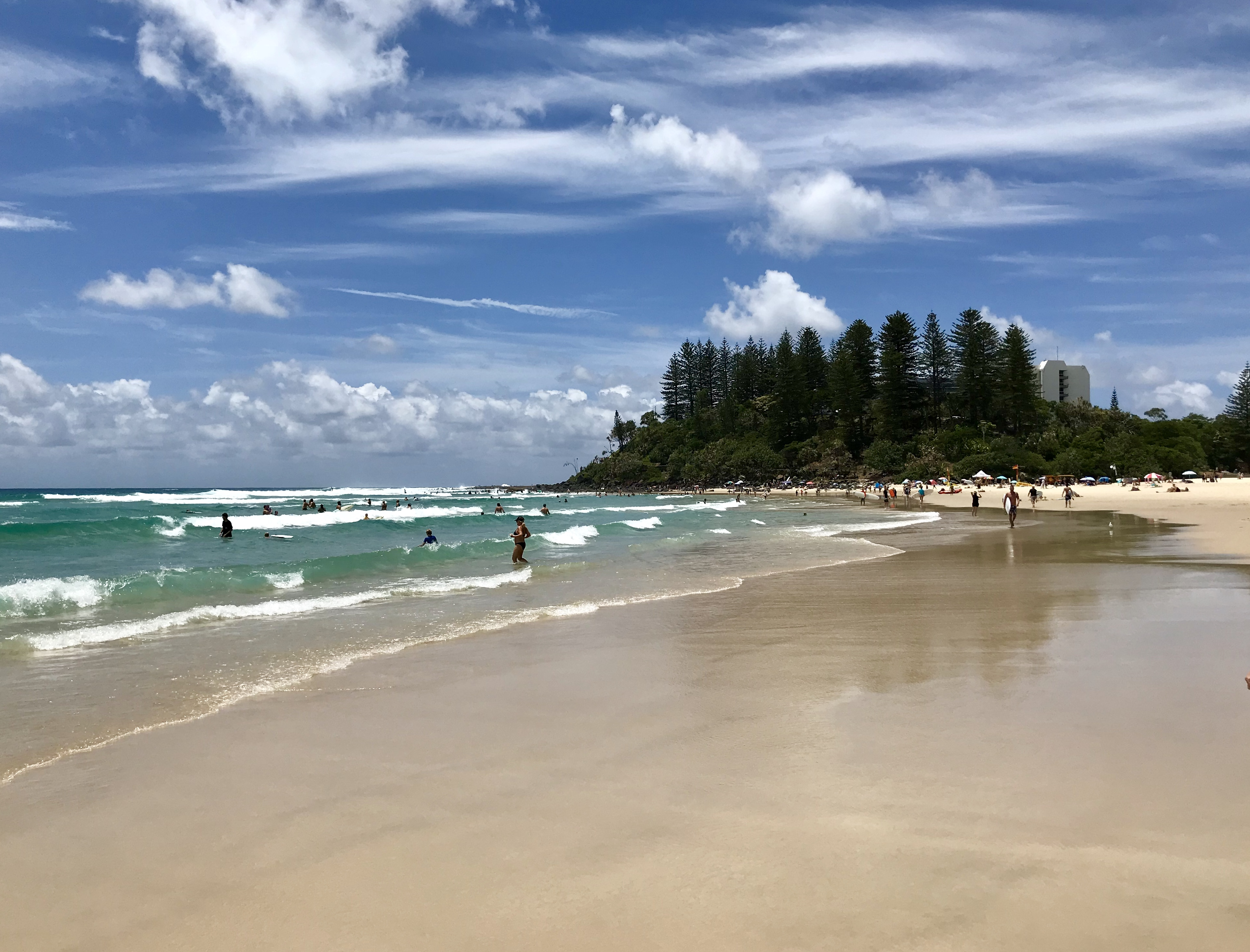
Greenmount Beach

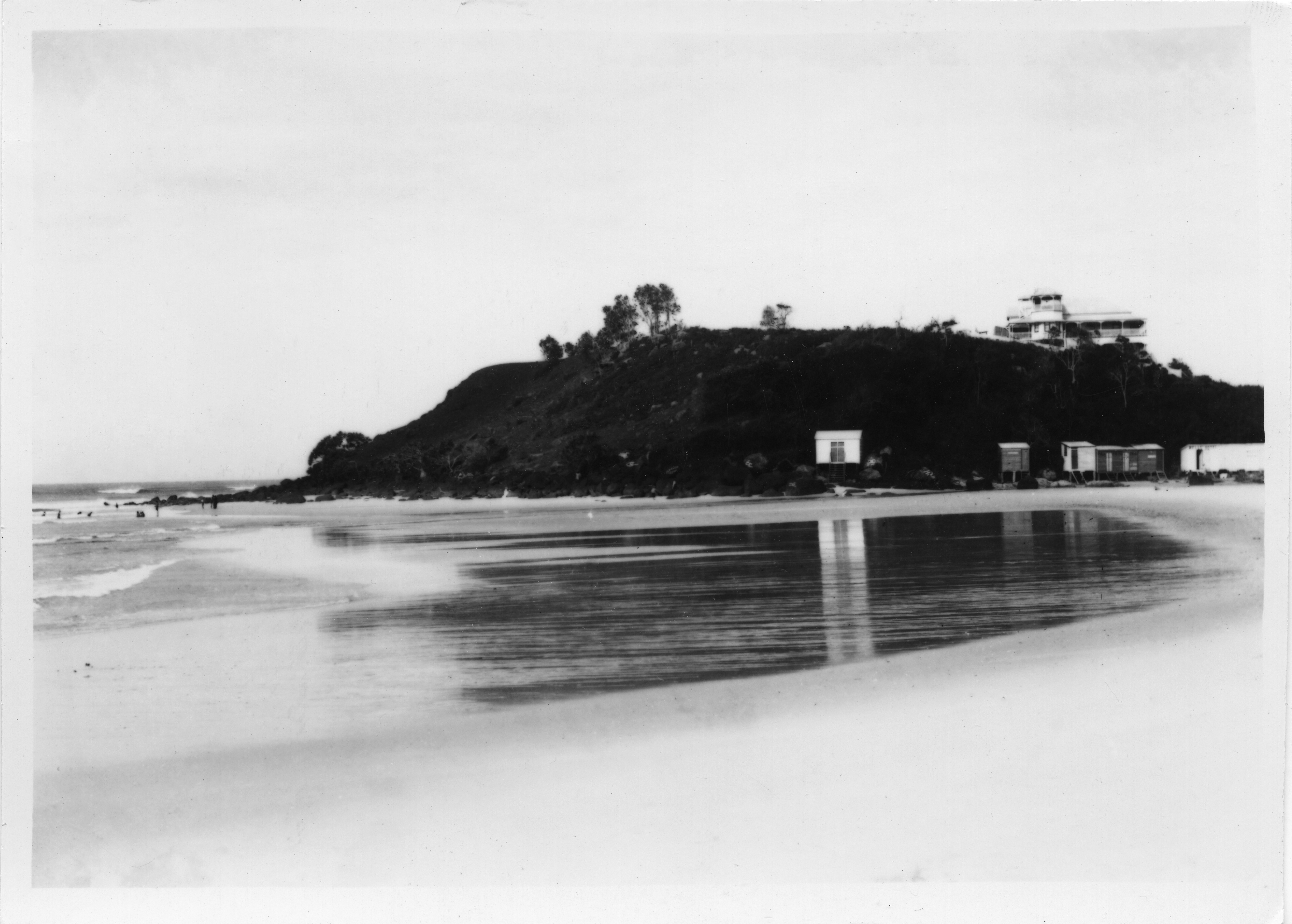
Greenmount guest house (Coolangatta, Gold Coast) with bathing boxes, circa 1908

Greenmount Beach is a beach located in Coolangatta on Queensland's Gold Coast in Australia.

Greenmount Point is a coastal headland separating the Coolangatta stretch of beach to the west and Rainbow Bay to the east.

Greenmount Beach is home to Tweed Heads & Coolangatta Surf Life Saving Club and Greenmount Beach Surf Club.

The beach is protected by shark nets. In September 2020 a man was fatally bitten by a shark while surfing in the water.

== History ==
The Greenmount Guest House was opened by Patrick J Fagan in 1905. He named it after his birthplace in County Meath, Ireland. The beach was named after the guest house.
