= Capstone Investment Advisors =

Hedge Fund based in New York

Capstone Investment Advisors, LLC
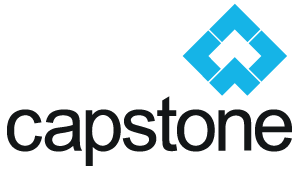
- Type: Private company
- Industry: Investment management
- Predecessor: Mako Global Derivatives
- Founded: 2004; 22 years ago
- Founder: Paul Britton
- Headquarters: 7 World Trade Center, New York City, U.S.
- Key people: Paul Britton (CEO)
- Products: Hedge fund
- AUM: US$13 billion (June 7, 2026)
- Number of employees: 320 (May 31, 2025)
- Parent: Capstone Holdings Group
- Website: www.capstoneco.com

Capstone Investment Advisors LLC (Capstone) is an American investment management firm headquartered in New York City. The firm specializes in volatility arbitrage which involves volatility and derivatives trading in various markets.

== Background ==
Paul Britton, a native of Epsom in the United Kingdom graduated in 1994 from the London Metropolitan University and worked for Saratoga Limited, an options trading firm of Vincent Viola. He was a trainee trader who traded options on the London International Financial Futures and Options Exchange. During the 1997 Asian financial crisis and 1998 Russian financial crisis, he profited significantly. He was influenced by Thomas Peterffy and Timber Hill who were among the first to embrace algorithmic trading and its use in global volatility. In 1999, he, David Segel and several partners performed a management buyout of Saratoga and changed its name to Mako Global Derivatives.

In 2001, Britton moved to the United States to establish its US operations. Shortly after, Britton witnessed the September 11 attacks from the New York Mercantile Exchange building which was slightly damaged from the attacks.

In 2004, Britton performed a management buyout of Mako Global Derivatives' U.S. operations establishing a Capstone as a new independent entity. It was originally established as a proprietary trading firm but in 2007, it started accepting outside capital and changed to a hedge fund structure which would focus on volatility strategies.

In 2007, Capstone also established a broker-dealer entity named Capstone Sales Advisors (renamed to Capstone Global Markets LLC in 2009) but it was closed on June 30, 2011. Due to the Madoff investment scandal that involved broker-dealers, investors wanted a platform free from conflict of interest so Capstone closed its broker-dealer business to focus on its investment business.

In October 2007, Capstone acquired a portfolio of distressed derivatives from RV Capita which was undergoing difficulties due to the 2008 financial crisis.

During the 2008 financial crisis, Capstone was well positioned. It made strong returns in January 2008. As a result, more investors put more cash into the firm. At this time, the firm believed the VIX had a ceiling and would rarely go above 40. However the Bankruptcy of Lehman Brothers led to the VIX going above 80 and the firm had to buy back its exposure at 65. As a result, Capstone made large losses and its assets shrank by several hundred million dollars. However the firm survived thanks to an investment from a big European client.

In June 2013, Dyal Capital acquired a 20% stake of Capstone for $60 million. In August 2020, Navigator Global Investments acquired Dyal Capital's stake of Capstone. The remaining 80% of the Capstone is owned by its partners.

According to Financial Times, from 2007 to 2021, Capstone had an annual return of 7% This included a 20% gain in 2020 due to the COVID-19 pandemic allowing the firm to acquire options for a lower price. In 2020, Capstone tail risk funds returned 280%. Capstone also benefitted from the stock volatility of the GameStop short squeeze.

In May 2023, it was reported that Capstone allocated more risk capital to Japan than ever before. This was based on the Bank of Japan's decision to maintain negative interest rates which Capstone believed would benefit its volatility trading strategy due to the uncertainties created. Britton has stated while Capstone is currently focused on Japan at the moment, it will move to China later on.
