= Shawbrook Bank =

British retail and commercial bank

Shawbrook

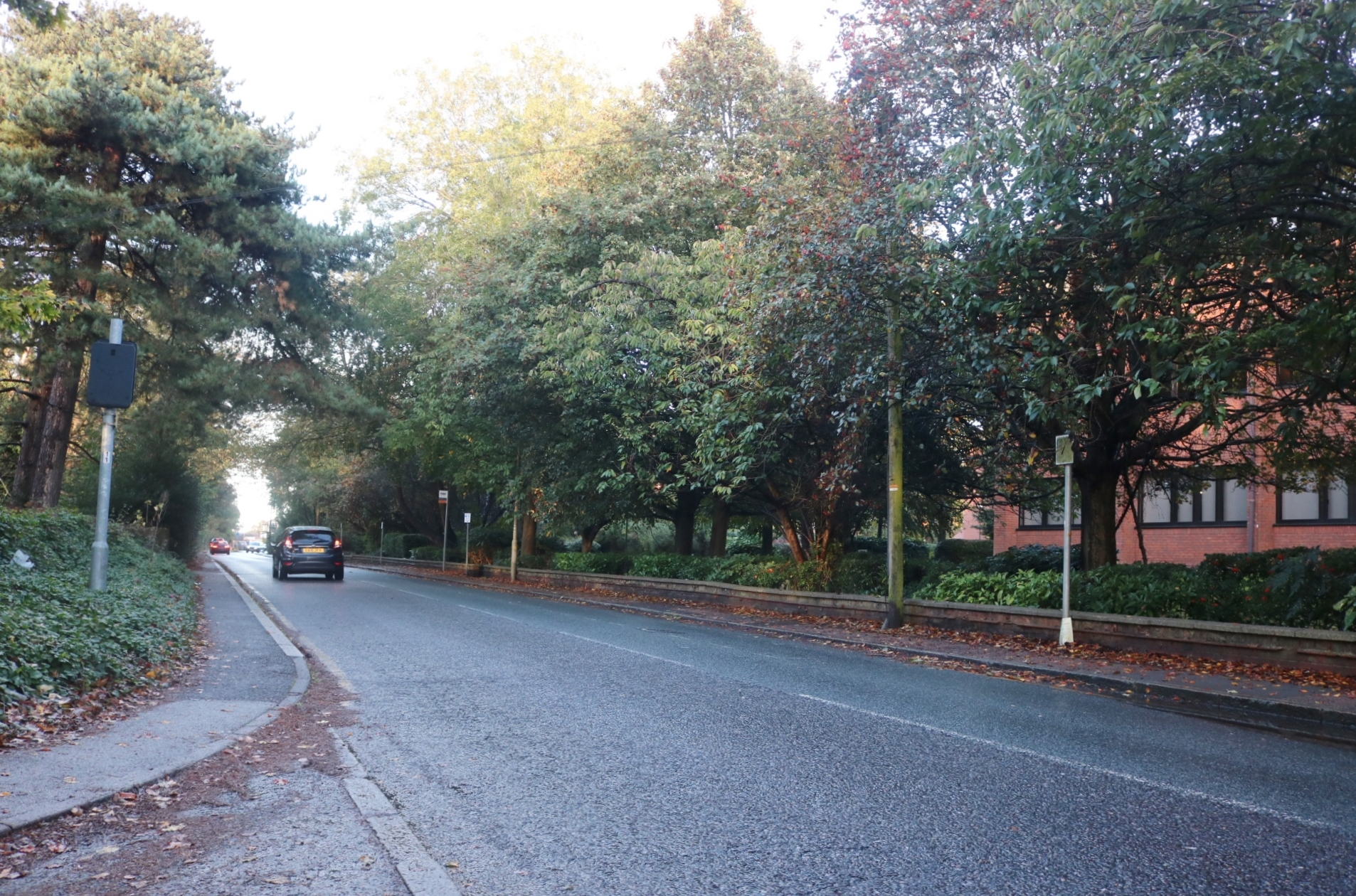
- Headquarters in Brentwood, Essex
- Type: Limited company
- Traded as: LSE: SHAW
- Industry: Financial services
- Founded: 1988
- Headquarters: Brentwood, Essex, England, UK
- Key people: John Callender (Chairman); Marcelino Castrillo (CEO)
- Products: Banking
- Revenue: ▲£646.9 million (2025)
- Operating income: ▲£682.1 million (2025)
- Net income: ▼£195.5 million (2025)
- Total assets: ▲£22,468.9 million (2025)
- Total equity: ▲£1,842.5 million (2025)
- Website: www.shawbrook.co.uk

Shawbrook Bank Limited is a British retail and commercial bank based in the United Kingdom. Its parent company, Shawbrook Group plc, is listed on the London Stock Exchange and is a constituent of the FTSE 250 Index.

== History ==
The bank has its origins in a department store chain, Whiteaway Laidlaw, which operated mainly in Asia and was established in 1877. Great Universal Stores bought the store chain in 1957.

The store chain included several finance arms including Whiteaway Laidlaw Bank which offered banking facilities to small businesses and personal customers and was incorporated as a separate company in February 1988.

Home Retail Group inherited the bank on its demerger from GUS in July 2006 and then sold it to Manchester Building Society in March 2007.

In February 2011, private investors led by RBS Equity Finance, which was later spun off from the Royal Bank of Scotland Group and became Pollen Street Capital, bought Whiteaway Laidlaw Bank. Whiteaway Laidlaw Bank rebranded as Shawbrook Bank in October 2011.

Singers Asset Finance was acquired in March 2012 and then rebranded as Shawbrook Asset Finance in March 2013. The bank acquired asset based lender Centric Commercial Finance in June 2014 and subsequently rebranded it as Shawbrook Business Credit. The bank was the subject of an initial public offering in April 2015, raising £90 million of cash to support the capital position and future growth.

A consortium led by BC Partners and Pollen Street Capital acquired the business for £868 million in July 2017.

In June 2023, Shawbrook completed the acquisition of specialist lender Bluestone Mortgages Limited (BML) from Bluestone Investment Holdings.

In October 2023, it was revealed that Shawbrook had made a number of unsuccessful takeover offers for Metro Bank prior to that bank's successful capital raise on 8 October. At the same time it was also revealed that Shawbrook had made an offer for Co-op Bank. Co-op Bank had reportedly been looking for a buyer since April 2023, with a deadline set for early October 2023.

In October 2025, Shawbrook announced plans to list a minimum of £200 million worth of shares on the London Stock Exchange. It was the subject of a new initial public offering on the London Stock Exchange on 30 October 2025. In December 2025, Shawbook acquired SME lending company Playter.

== Operations ==
The bank offers loans to small and medium-sized businesses that are unable to obtain finance from the main commercial banks.
