= Duranbah Beach =

Surfing beach in New South Wales, Australia

Coordinates: 28.1674°S 153.5518°E

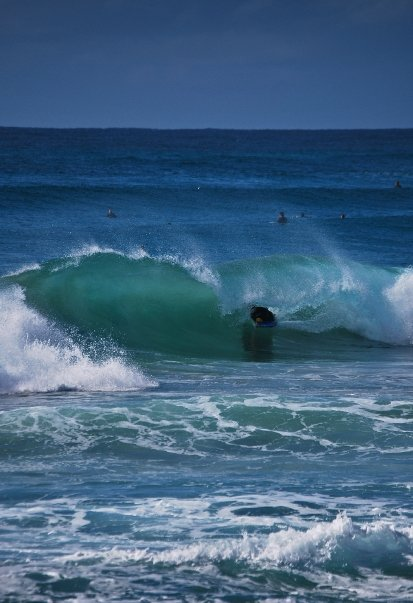
Duranbah Beach

Duranbah Beach (/djʊəˈrænbɑː/ dew-RAN-bah), officially known as Flagstaff Beach, but also known as Dbah is the northernmost beach in New South Wales. Located in the Tweed Shire, Duranbah Beach is situated between the mouth of the Tweed River and the rocky headland Point Danger which also marks the Queensland-New South Wales border. The beach is 350 meters in length with vegetated dunes running along 200 metres. The southern end of the beach features BBQs, sheltered picnic areas including a block of toilets and shower just behind it.

Duranbah Beach is well known by surfers for its surf break and large swell. It is recognised both nationally and internationally as having a powerful, high-quality surf break for both surfers and boogs (a boog getting a barrel shown in the image). Big surfing events have been staged there including the Quiksilver Pro Gold Coast, the professional surfing contest which was held in conjunction with Snapper Rocks and the state, national and international bodyboarding contests.

== Surf conditions ==
Duranbah Beach is popular for its surf conditions. The beach faces east, which exposes it to high wave energy and high longshore rates. The waves are predominantly from the south-easterly side; however, they can come from all seaward directions. The waves are on average 1.3 metres and have reached six metres in height during a king tide. There are often persistent rips and strong tidal currents which make the beach a potentially hazardous place to swim.

== Local Beach History ==
In 1956 Jack Evans built the Snapper Rocks Sea Baths, with an adjacent shark pool for public viewing. The pools moved to the adjacent Tweed River mouth in 1961.

== See also ==
- List of beaches
- Surfing in Australia
