= Charbel Nader =

Australian investment banker

Portrait of Charbel Nader c. 2020 One of the many roles Nader currently occupies is a non-executive director on the board of Australian Microcap telecommunications company Hubify

Charbel Nader is an Australian investment banker who was the architect of a number of innovative Film Financing transactions in the 1990s the most notable being a series of Village Roadshow off balance sheet film financings which funded Films such as The Matrix series and Ocean's Eleven in conjunction with Warner Bros.

After a successful stint in Sydney with News Corp Australia's venture capital vehicle e-Ventures and PBL/Nine Network where he was responsible for the Macquarie Nine Film raising; a joint endeavour between the Nine Network and Macquarie Bank he returned to Melbourne as managing director of McHudson Corporate.

In June 2007 he was recruited by Pitt Capital Partners. to head up and establish a Melbourne office of the Investment Bank which is a wholly owned subsidiary of one of Australia's oldest publicly listed corporations Soul Patts which also owns 61% of New Hope Group.

He is credited with leading the Pitt Capital Partners team that successfully completed the $236m debt and equity recapitalisation of Living and Leisure Australia (ASX: LLA) (originally managed by MFS/Octaviar), the only successful mid cap recapitalisation completed in 2008, at the height of the global credit crisis.

He is a Founder and Executive Vice-president of Australia Acquisition Corp., He is also (founding) Chairman of Metro Media Holdings, publisher of The Weekly Review, and was instrumental in its merger with Fairfax Community News Network in December 2011. In 2015 he oversaw and managed the sale of the remaining 50% interest in Metro Media Holdings for $72m.

In August 2014 he helped lead a consortium to acquire Madman Entertainment from troubled toy wholesaler Funtastic Ltd (whose major shareholders include Lachlan Murdoch, Gerry Harvey and Craig Mathieson.
