= Surfing Australia =

Governing body for the sport of surfing in Australia

- Sport: Surfing
- Jurisdiction: Australia
- Abbreviation: SA
- Founded: 1963
- Affiliation: ISF
- Headquarters: Coolangatta, Queensland
- Chairman: Norm Innis
- Women's coach: Layne Beachley

Official website
- www.surfingaustralia.com
- (Australia)

Surfing Australia is the governing body for the sport of surfing in Australia.

== History ==
The Australian Surfriders Association was founded in 1963, and was renamed Surfing Australia in 1993.

In 2013, for its 50th anniversary, Surfing Australia named Mark Richards the 1963-2013 most influential surfer in Australia. In 2014 it inaugurated the Australian Boardriders Battle, and renewed its partnership with the Edith Cowan University to further develop the Hurley Surfing Australia High Performance Centre (HPC), the world's first facility dedicated to the development of elite surfers and coaches. In 2014, Surfing Australia turned to the alcohol industry for sponsorship after the federal government abolished its anti-alcohol health promotion agency that provided part of the surfing association's funding.

In 2015, Surfing Australia congratulated the Olympics' committee choice to include surfing in the Tokyo 2020 Games. In 2017–2018, the HPC was renovated and upgraded to prepare the Australian surfer for the Olympic competition. Surfing Australia also trained the Olympic contestants in a $30-million artificial surf park that pumps out 1,000 waves per hour.

== Structure ==
The national body has six state member associations:

- Surfing Queensland
- Surfing NSW
- Surfing Western Australia
- Surfing Victoria
- Surfing South Australia
- Surfing Tasmania

== Publications ==
- The Best of the Best from Surfing Australia, Hachette Australia (collection of photos taken between 2013 and 2017)

== See also ==
- Surfing in Australia
