= Alternative Credit Investments =

British investment trust

- Company type: Public
- Traded as: LSE: ACI
- Founded: 2014; 12 years ago
- Fate: Acquired by Waterfall Asset Management
- Headquarters: London, England
- Key people: Stuart Cruickshank (chair)
- Website: www.pollenstreetsecuredlending.com

Alternative Credit Investments (LSE: ACI), formerly Pollen Street Secured Lending and, before that, P2P Global Investments, is a British investment trust. The company invests in consumer and small and medium-sized enterprise loans and in corporate trade receivables. Launched in May 2014, the company was listed on the London Stock Exchange and was a constituent of the FTSE 250 Index. The chairman is Stuart Cruickshank. On 17 September 2019 the company changed its name from P2P Global Investments plc to Pollen Street Secured Lending plc, and on 20 October 2020 the company changed its name to Alternative Credit Investments plc.

In November 2020, Waterfall Asset Management made an agreed offer to acquire the company. On 11 March 2021 the High Court sanctioned the company's GBP 639.2 million takeover by US-based Waterfall Asset Management. Its shares in London were suspended on 15 March 2021 and delisted the day after.
