= Snapper Rocks =

Small rocky outcrop on the Gold Coast, Queensland, Australia

Coordinates: 28.1625°S 153.550°E

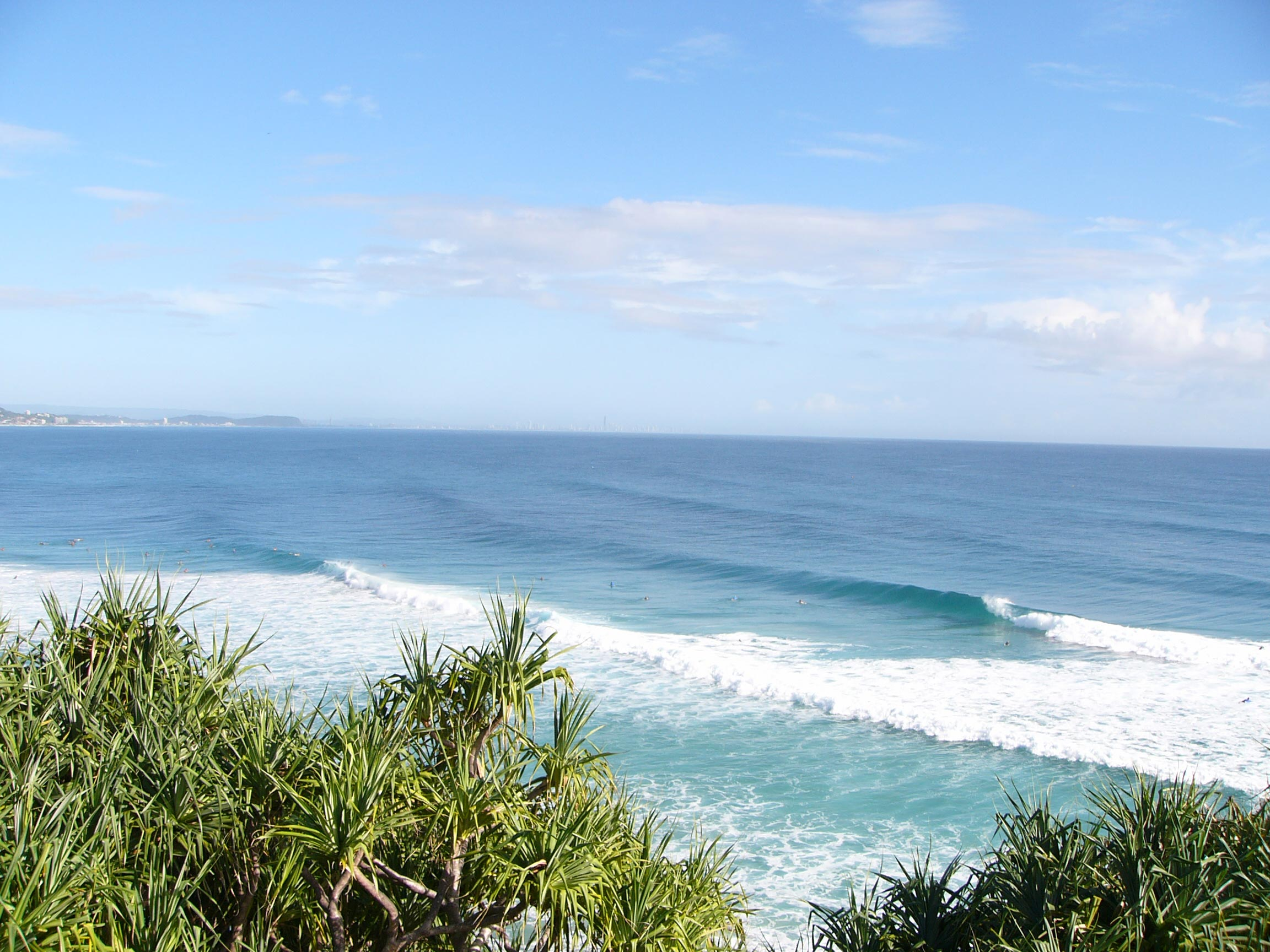
Snapper Rocks surf break, 2006

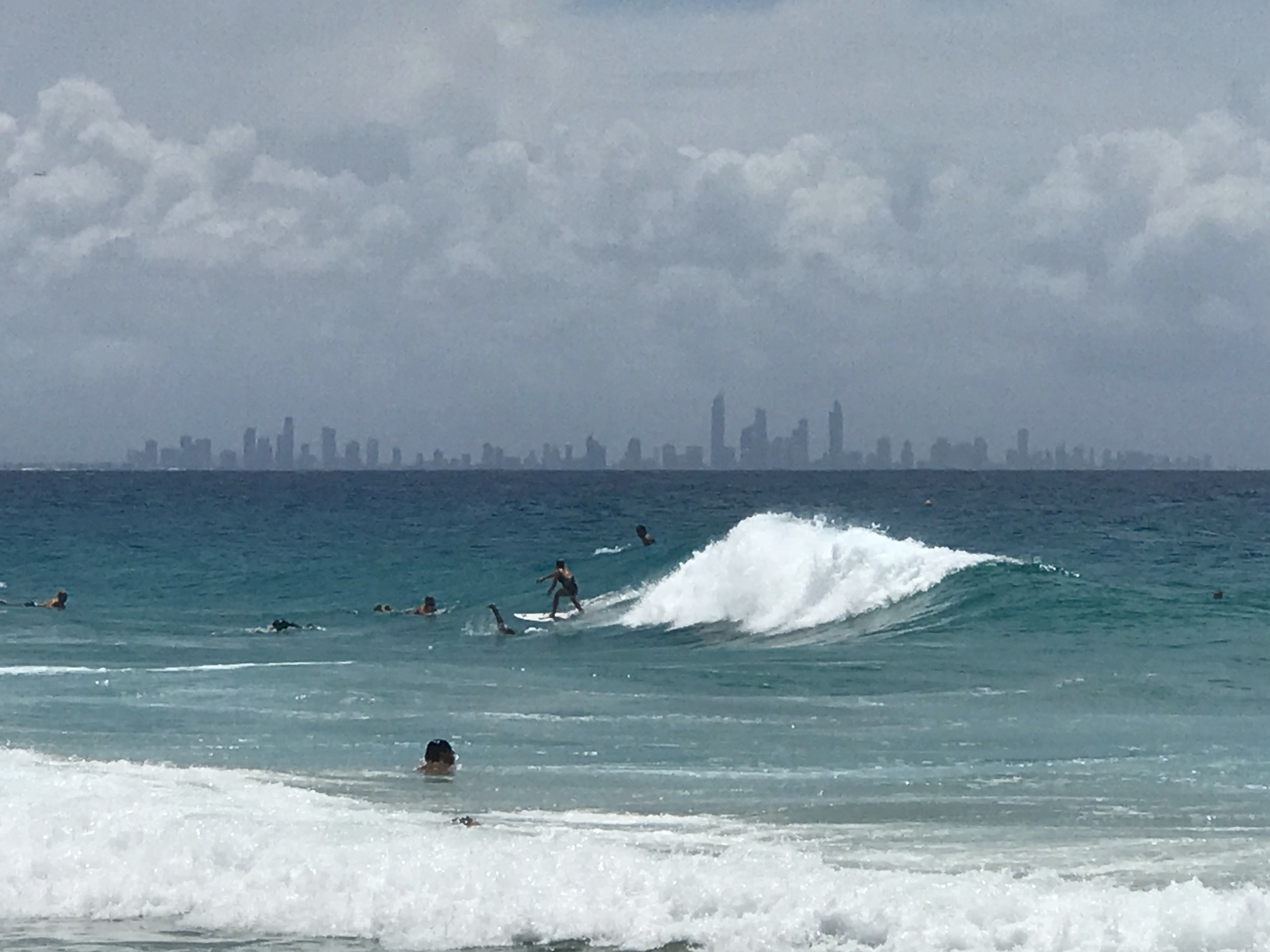
Surfing at Snapper Rocks

Snapper Rocks is a small rocky outcrop on the northern side of Point Danger at the southern end of Rainbow Bay on the Gold Coast, Queensland, Australia. It is a famous surf break and today the start of the large sand bank known to surfers as the Superbank.

== History ==
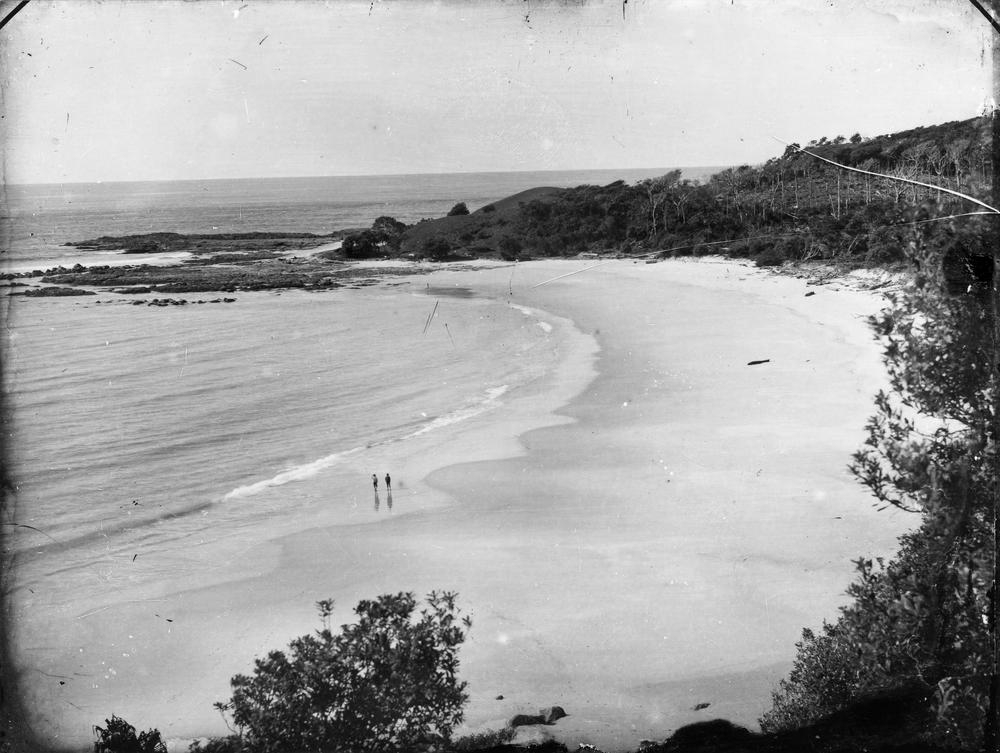
Snapper Rocks viewed from Greenmount Hill across Rainbow Bay, 1891

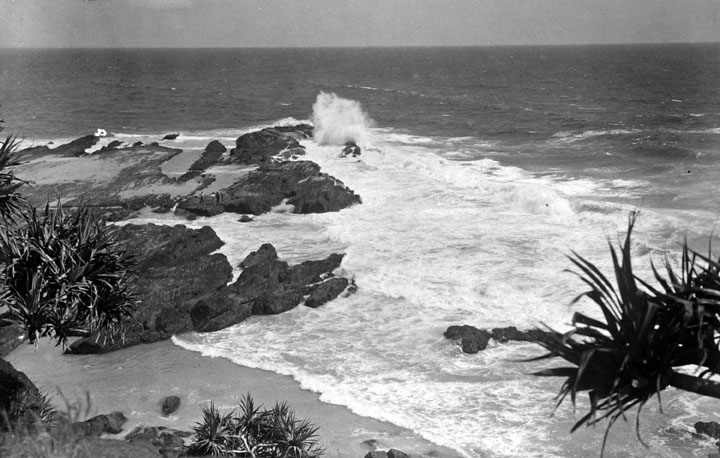
Snapper Rocks, Coolangatta, viewed from the south, circa 1934

It is believed that Snapper Rocks were named by W.L. Edwardson, captain of HM Colonial Cutter Snapper which passed by Point Danger in July 1822.

== Surfing ==
Snapper Rocks is a point break, which as of 2007, forms the first part of the man-made "Superbank" surf break.

Since 1995 the Tweed River sand bypass system has pumped sand from the Tweed River mouth to beaches to the north to ensure the river mouth is safe for shipping, and to stabilise coastal erosion north of the river. This has resulted in a large build-up of sand between Snapper Rocks to Kirra, which as of 2007, has extended the beaches in this area seawards around 100–200m, and created a new, world-class sandbar surf break called "the Superbank".

The Superbank extends from Snapper Rocks Point, through Rainbow Bay, Greenmount Point, Coolangatta Beach, and Kirra, for a distance of around 2 kilometres (1.2 mi). Multiple barrel sections can now occur at any point along this length. The quality of the surf in the first 4 of these sections has markedly improved since the 1990s, creating one of the longest, hollowest and best waves in the world. However, the quality of the last section, Kirra, which has long been regarded as one of the world's best waves prior to the formation of the Superbank, has suffered. There have been calls to modify aspects of the sand bypass system to attempt to restore Kirra to its former quality, although exactly how this is to be done is not clear. It is possible that an optimum, medium build-up of sand (such as was reportedly the state in the early 2000s) may create the longest and best waves over the entire length, including Kirra.

The sheer quality of the man-made wave has greatly increased the level of surf tourism in the region, which has also resulted in extreme crowding of the wave. On a good day, over 500 surfers can be counted over the 2 kilometres (1.2 mi) distance, with multiple drop-ins.

== Pool ==
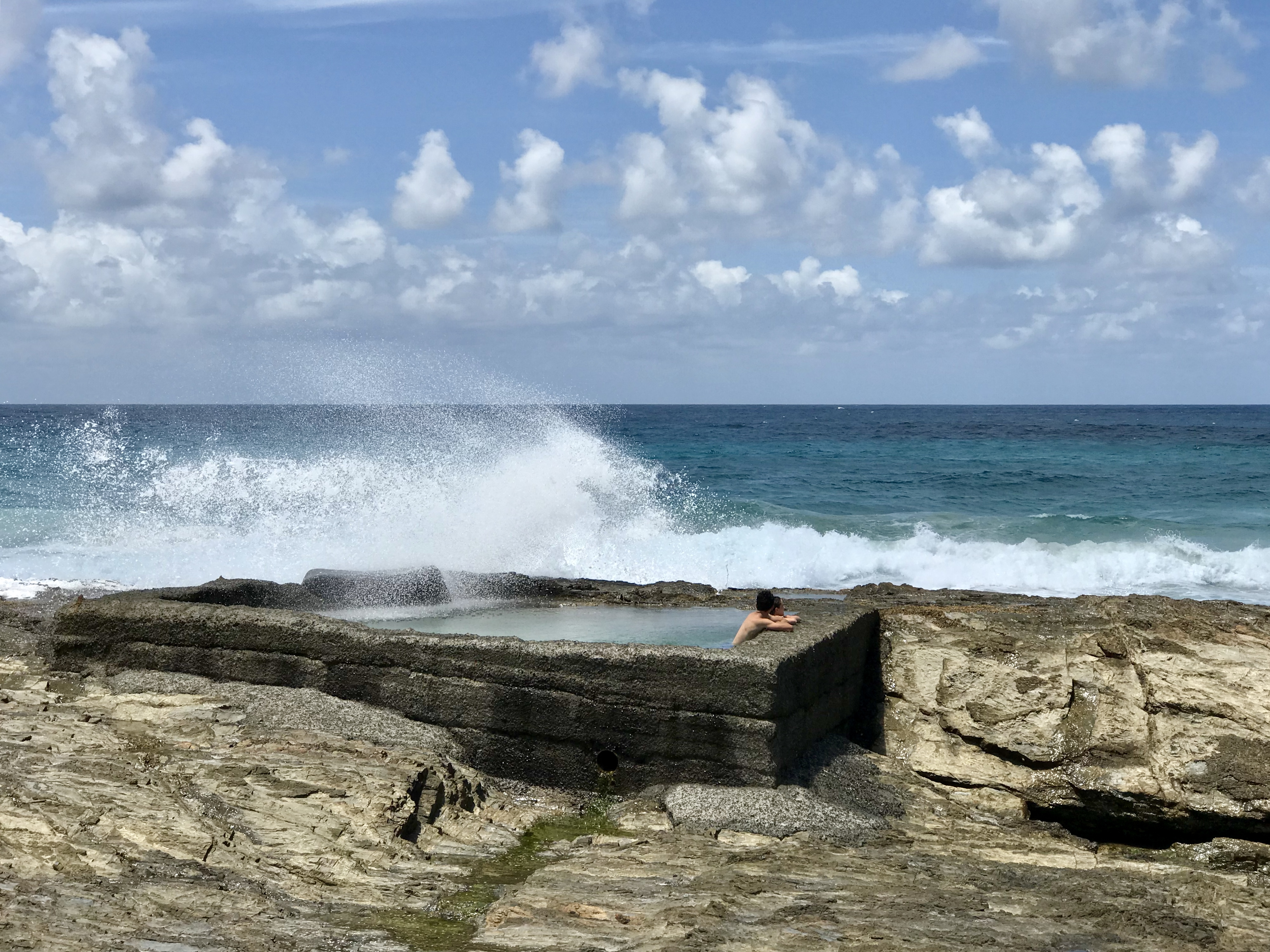
Snapper Rocks Sea Baths

In 1956 Jack Evans built the Snapper Rocks Sea Baths, with an adjacent shark pool for public viewing. Later that year the Boyd brothers, local fishermen, caught two bottlenose dolphins in the Terranora Creek which Evans took and put in the pool for the Jack Evans Porpoise Pool show. The pools moved to the mouth of the Tweed River near to Duranbah beach in 1961. Only remnants of the pools remain today.

== See also ==
- Rainbow Bay
