= Waterfall Asset Management =

New York Hedge Fund

Waterfall Asset Management, LLC
- Company type: Private
- Industry: Investment management
- Founded: 2005; 21 years ago
- Founders: Tom Capasse; Jack Ross
- Headquarters: 1251 Avenue of the Americas, New York City, U.S.
- Products: Hedge funds Alternative investments
- AUM: US$12.5 billion (July 2023)
- Number of employees: 183 (2023)
- Website: waterfallam.com

Waterfall Asset Management (Waterfall) is an American alternative investment management firm headquartered in New York City. The firm's focuses investments in credit structured products mainly high-yield asset-backed securities (ABS). It also invests in real estate and private equity.

Outside the U.S., Waterfall has offices in London, Dublin and Hong Kong.

== Background ==
In the mid-1980s to the early 1990s, Tom Capasse and Jack Ross worked together at Merrill Lynch where they established its ABS Group. Ross worked on the first auto loan securitization in 1985 when he was previously at Drexel Burnham Lambert while Capasse crafted some of the first subprime mortgage-backed securities in the late 1980s for Merrill Lynch. They later went their own ways with Ross creating his own broker-dealer firm, Licent Capital while Capasse moved to the Macquarie Group managing the principal finance group.

In late 2004, Ross called Capasse with an idea to start their own firm, Waterfall Asset Management. They connected with boutique asset management firm, M.D. Sass to launch its first fund, the Waterfall Eden Fund which targeted residential mortgages and home equity ABS.

During this time ABS deals became publicly traded and by 2007 private placements had given way to the securitization market. When the subprime mortgage crisis occurred, Waterfall was able to take advantage as Capasse and Ross were able to structure private placement deals in a new manner. Waterfall made use of principal reduction for mortgages which were was rarely used by its peers. The best opportunities for Waterfall were found in ABS securities that were once had a credit rating of AAA but later downgraded to junk status.

By 2012, Waterfall had become known as a big buyer of distressed single-family home mortgages. To support its effort, it formed a venture with Coldwell Banker Commercial named Coldwell Banker Commercial Alliance. Waterfall would buy distressed commercial real-estate assets and the venture would will sell and lease the properties. The leasing deals would be under 100,000 square feet and sales valued at $10 million or less.

Waterfall moved away from a traditional hedge fund structure to become more like an asset management company. Apart from the hedge funds it managed, it also dealt in the separately managed account business as well as private equity. By offering a wider product offering, it was able to attract mandats from pension funds and retirement plans.

In 2013, Ready Capital was founded by Waterfall converting one of its private funds to a commercial mortgage REIT and listing it on the New York Stock Exchange under the ticker 'RC'. It is a real estate finance company that deals in small to medium balance commercial loans. Waterfall currently is its external manager.

In July 2013, Dyal Capital acquired a minority interest in Waterfall from M.D. Sass-Macquarie Financial Strategies, a joint venture between M.D. Sass and Macquarie Group that invests in investment funds.

In November 2018, Waterfall issued $571.8 Million in jumbo reverse mortgage bonds, the first offering of its kind since the 2008 financial crisis.

In August 2020, Navigator Global Investments (NGI) agreed to buy Dyal Capital's stake in Waterfall. The deal was done in two parts with the second part being after 2025 where NGI will purchase the remainder of Dyal Capital's interest.

In November 2020, Waterfall agreed to acquire Alternative Credit Investments for £639m in cash.
