= Mesirow Financial =

American financial services company

Mesirow
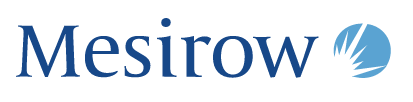

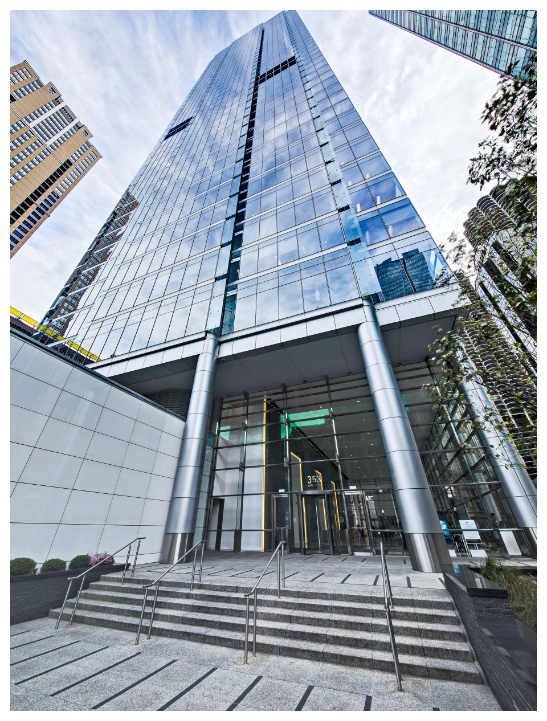
- Global headquarters in Chicago, Illinois
- Type: Privately held company
- Industry: Financial services
- Founded: 1937; 89 years ago
- Headquarters: 353 North Clark Street, Chicago, Illinois, U.S.
- Area served: Worldwide
- Key people: Shawn Beber (CEO), Richard S. Price (Chairman)
- Services: Investment management, Capital markets, Investment banking, Private equity, Real estate, Wealth management
- AUM: $410.3 billion (September 30, 2026)
- Number of employees: 500+ (2026)
- Website: mesirow.com

Mesirow is an American privately held financial services company based in Chicago, Illinois. The firm is employee-owned and 100% of voting shares are held by employees. Mesirow provides investment management, capital markets, wealth management and investment banking services.

Mesirow was founded in Chicago, Illinois in 1937. The firm now has offices in 22 cities around the world, including London and Hong Kong.

== History ==
In 1937, Norman Mesirow borrowed $95,000 to buy a seat on the New York Stock Exchange and subsequently formed Mesirow & Co. Wealth management was the firm's founding capability, but Mesirow expanded to offer services spanning investment management, capital markets, investment banking and insurance.

Mesirow's real estate arm developed the firm's current global headquarters at 353 North Clark in Chicago's River North neighborhood. In 2010, Mesirow sold the building to Tishman Speyer Properties for an estimated $385 million. Mesirow announced a 10-year extension on its current lease in January 2024.

In 2015, Verizon sold its New Jersey operations center to Mesirow for $650 million, with an agreement to lease back the facility from Mesirow for a 20-year term. The following year, Mesirow acquired Verizon's regional headquarters in Irving, Texas for $344 million.

In July 2016, Mesirow sold its insurance business to Alliant.

In March 2018, Mesirow sold its $8 billion hedge fund business to Lighthouse Investment Partners. That same month, Mesirow acquired three Gateway Casinos properties in Greater Vancouver. The properties, valued at more than CA$500 million, were leased back to Gateway and its subsidiaries.

In March 2019, former politician Melissa Bean left JPMorgan Chase to join Mesirow as chief executive officer of their wealth management division.

Mesirow completed financing for a new United States Department of Veterans Affairs clinic in Ponce, Puerto Rico in April 2019.

In February 2020, Mesirow bought the Las Vegas Raiders headquarters and practice facility in Henderson, Nevada for $191 million in a sale-and-leaseback.

In 2021, Mesirow announced plans to expand in Florida and the Southeastern United States. Mesirow now has offices in Miami, Miami Beach and Boca Raton.

President Natalie A. Brown was named chief executive officer in June 2022, replacing Richard S. Price and becoming the company's first female CEO. Before the transition, Brown was featured on the cover of CEO Magazine. In November 2022, WomenInc. named her one of the most influential women executives in corporate America.

In August 2022, Brown told Bloomberg that Mesirow is looking to expand its presence in the municipal bond market.

In 2022, Mesirow led the $275 million financing of the NASA Headquarters in Washington, D.C.

The International Finance Corporation selected Mesirow as a Primary Discount Note dealer in December 2022.

Mesirow acquired long-time Chicago wealth management firm Front Barnett in September 2023.

In October 2023, Creative Planning acquired Mesirow's corporate retirement advisory services division, which had approximately $13 billion in assets under management.

Mesirow Fiduciary Solutions began providing RIA services for WEX Inc. in December 2023.

Mesirow acquired Bastion Management, a private credit manager specializing in asset-backed lending, on December 31, 2024.

On January 8, 2025, Metlife announced that they were acquiring three investment teams and assets managed by Mesirow. The deal closed on February 28, 2025.

In March 2026, Mesirow announced that its CTL & Structured Debt Products and Sale Leaseback Capital groups had arranged a $40 million private placement for Denver Summit FC.

On May 4, 2026, Mesirow announced that they were acquiring LeafHouse Financial Advisors, a division of LeafHouse Financial Group. The deal closed on July 1, 2026.

On August 13, 2026, Mesirow announced that its Mesirow Fiduciary Solutions unit had agreed to acquire the plan-level 3(38) business of flexPATH Strategies, LLC. The acquisition was completed on October 26, 2026.

In November 2026, Mesirow announced that Shawn Beber, former president and CEO of CIBC Bank USA, would become its chief executive officer, succeeding interim CEO Richard S. Price, who would remain with the firm as executive chairman. The board of directors voted unanimously for the appointment following a search. Beber had spent more than two decades at the Canadian Imperial Bank of Commerce (CIBC), holding senior roles in U.S. commercial banking and wealth management, risk management, legal, and strategy and corporate development.

== Recognition ==
From 2019 to 2026 Mesirow received a top score of 100 on the Human Rights Campaign Foundation's Corporate Equality Index.

In 2020, InvestmentNews recognized Mesirow on their list of Best Places to Work for Financial Advisors.

Mesirow was named one of the 100 best places to work in Chicago by Crain's Chicago Business from 2018 to 2022. Pensions & Investments has named the firm a "Best Place to Work in Money Management" on six occasions.

Mesirow was named to the Barron's list of top 100 registered investment adviser firms from 2021 to 2026, most recently ranking 46th. In 2026, Crain's Chicago Business ranked Mesirow Wealth Management 12th on its list of the largest wealth management firms in the Chicago area, by local assets under management.

In 2022, Mesirow was named MoneyAge's Currency Manager of the Year for the third consecutive year. The firm now has more than $150 billion of currency assets under supervision.

In 2023, Mesirow's retirement advisory services division was named a Top DC Advisor Team by the National Association of Plan Advisors for the fourth consecutive year, with $11.3 billion of assets under management across 226,000 plan participants.
