= LeRoy Grannis =

LeRoy "Granny" Grannis (August 12, 1917 – February 3, 2011) was a veteran photographer. His portfolio of photography of surfing and related sea images from the 1960s enjoys a reputation that led The New York Times to dub him "the godfather of surfphotography." He was born in Hermosa Beach, California.

== Life ==
Living a beachfront childhood, by the age of five Grannis was taken swimming and bodysurfing by his father. Soon Grannis made himself a bellyboard from a piece of wood and rode it during vacations in his mother's home state of Florida. In 1931, at age 14, his father gave him a 6' x 2' pine board from which he hacked a kneeboard using a drawknife. At Hermosa Pier, stand up surfing was popular, so he began borrowing boards until he could get his own. Later, he struggled to balance surf time with family and work as a member of the Palos Verdes Surf Club, second only in America to the Corona Del Mar Surf Board Club, which was established in the late 1920s.

== Odd jobs and war ==
Unable to afford an education at UCLA during the Depression, Grannis dropped out and found work as a carpenter, junkyard de-tinner and spent some years at Standard Oil. He enlisted in the U.S. Army Air Corps (now the Air Force) in 1943, serving as a pilot flying supply lines to troops in combat and remaining on active reserve until retiring as a major in 1977. Several fellow surf club members were employed with Pacific Bell, and Grannis joined them in 1946.

== Peace and new opportunities ==
He had already begun to venture into photography, and several of his pictures were featured in photo pioneer and close friend John Heath "Doc" Ball's 1946 book California Surfriders. He surfed the occasional contest during the 1950s, gradually settling into the role of assisting Hoppy Swarts at the controls during the early years of the United States Surfing Association. The telephone company job had given him an ulcer by 1959 and his doctor advised him to take up a hobby, and Ball suggested more serious photography.

His work soon appeared in prominent surf culture magazines of the time including Surfer, Reef and Surfing Illustrated. He quickly became one of the sport's most important documentarians. Other photographers were shooting from the water, but they were forced to return to land to reload. Grannis developed a rubber-lined box that enabled him to change film in the lineup. He spent the decade in California and Hawaii, capturing the best surfers in the world riding the best surf. He was a photo editor of Surfing Illustrated and of International Surfing, which he co-founded. He was named Grand Master of the 2007 Hermosa Beach Art Walk "Salute to 100 Summers."

== Some awards and accomplishments ==
He was elected to the International Surfing Hall of Fame as the number one lensman in 1966 and in 2002 was awarded SIMA's Lifetime Achievement Award. Grannis was the subject of The Surfer's Journal's first ode to master photographers in 1998 with a 1998 hardback compilation of Grannis' 1960s photos entitled Photo:Grannis, and his work was later featured in Stacy Peralta's 2004 award-winning documentary of the sport, Riding Giants. In 2005, M+B Gallery in Los Angeles gave Grannis his first art gallery exhibition and since then, his photographs have been exhibited at galleries, art fairs and museums both at home and abroad, including New York, Los Angeles, Paris, London and Antwerp. In 2006, Taschen published LeRoy Grannis: Birth of a Culture as a limited-edition, signed collector's edition monograph. Due to the extreme popularity of the book, TASCHEN has since released two additional popular editions of the book.

As said by Jason Borte, "Leroy Grannis wasn't the first to depict the California lifestyle with his photos. It wasn't his idea to begin shooting in the first place. His contributions to surfing photography occurred over a brief 12-year period, and he hasn't much bothered with it since 1971. Nevertheless, most of the great images from the '60s golden age of surfing, regardless of the magazine, bear the inscription "Photo: Grannis". In 1971, fed up with increased competition for the perfect angle, Grannis quit shooting surfing and soon found himself involved in hang gliding. The sport balanced surfing in his life, and he held a brief stint as photographer for Hang Gliding magazine. Several injuries, including a badly fractured leg in 1981, caused him to find a new outlet. This time it was windsurfing. Until the late 1980s, Grannis both engaged in and photographed the sport.

Grannis moved with his wife to Carlsbad, California, after retiring from Pacific Bell in 1977. Grannis married Katie LaVerne Tracy in 1939, when she was 20, and the couple had four children- Kit, Frank, Nancy, and John, six grandchildren- Robert, Cindy, Alan, Elizabeth, Alana, and Kaylee, and three great-grandchildren- Casey, Emily, and Dane, and two great-great grandchildren during their 69-year marriage before Katie died on December 3, 2008, at age 89.

== Death ==
Grannis died on February 3, 2011, at his home on Hermosa Beach, California.

== Bibliography ==
- Surf Photography of the 1960s and 1970s (2007) ISBN 978-3-8228-4859-3
