= Uluwatu, Bali =

Village in Bali, Indonesia

Uluwatu ᬉᬮᬸᬯᬢᬸ
- Village
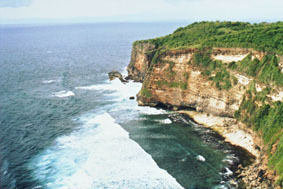
- Cliffs and wave breaks at Uluwatu

- Location in Bali
- Coordinates: 8°50′S 115°05′E
- Country: Indonesia
- Province: Bali
- Regency: Badung
- District: South Kuta
- Village (desa): Pecatu
- Metropolitan area: Sarbagita

Population (2017)
  - Total: 250
- Time zone: UTC+08

Uluwatu (ᬉᬮᬸᬯᬢᬸ) is a village on the south-western tip of the Bukit Peninsula of Bali, Indonesia. It is home to the Uluwatu Temple.

== Etymology ==
The name Uluwatu comes from ulu, meaning 'land's end', and watu, meaning 'rock'.

== Location ==
Administratively, Uluwatu is an area in the territory of Pecatu village, district of South Kuta (Kuta Selatan), Badung regency.

Uluwatu is at the westerly end of the Bukit Peninsula and borders the Indian Ocean.

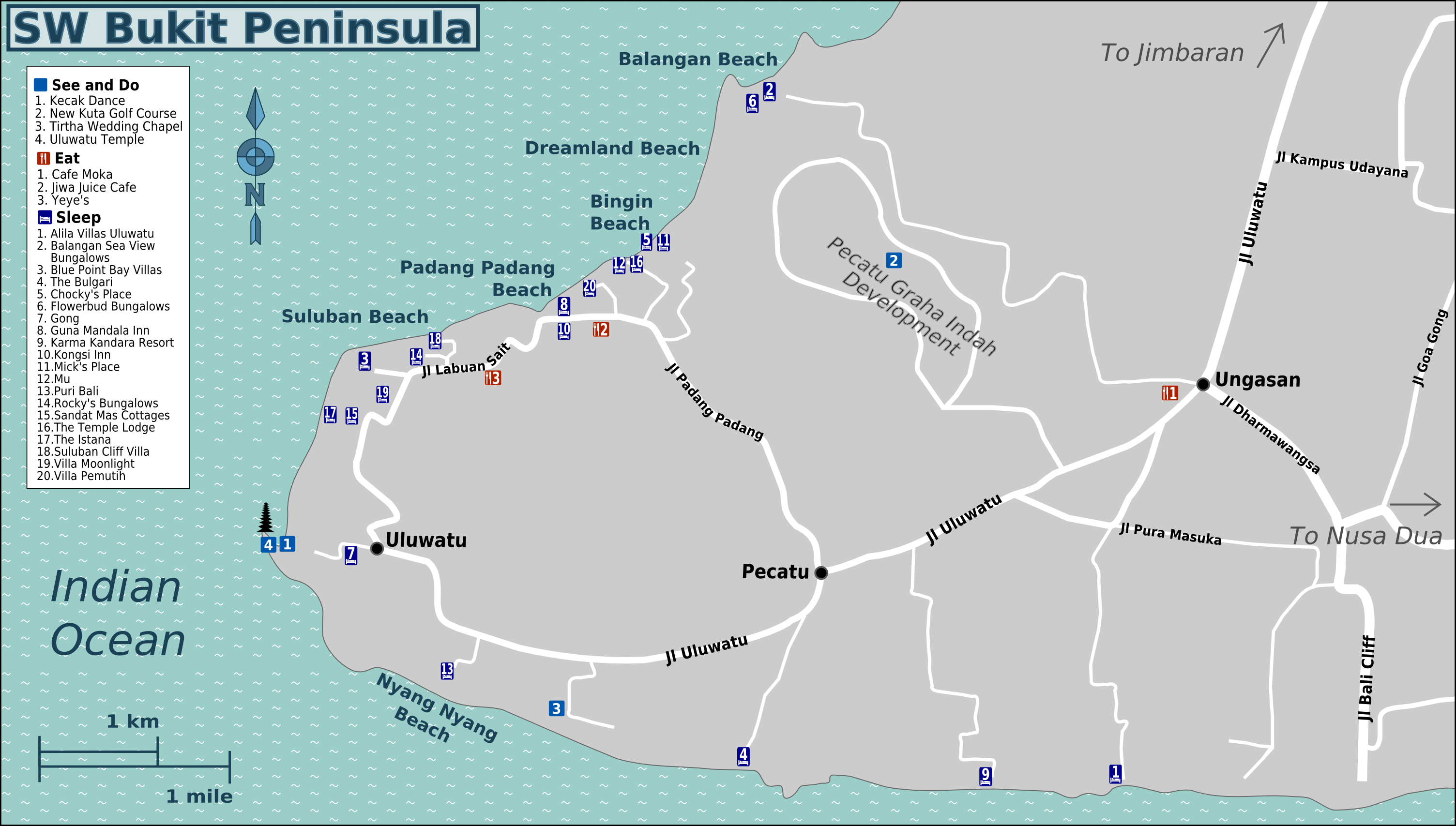
Map of the south-west of the Bukit Peninsula

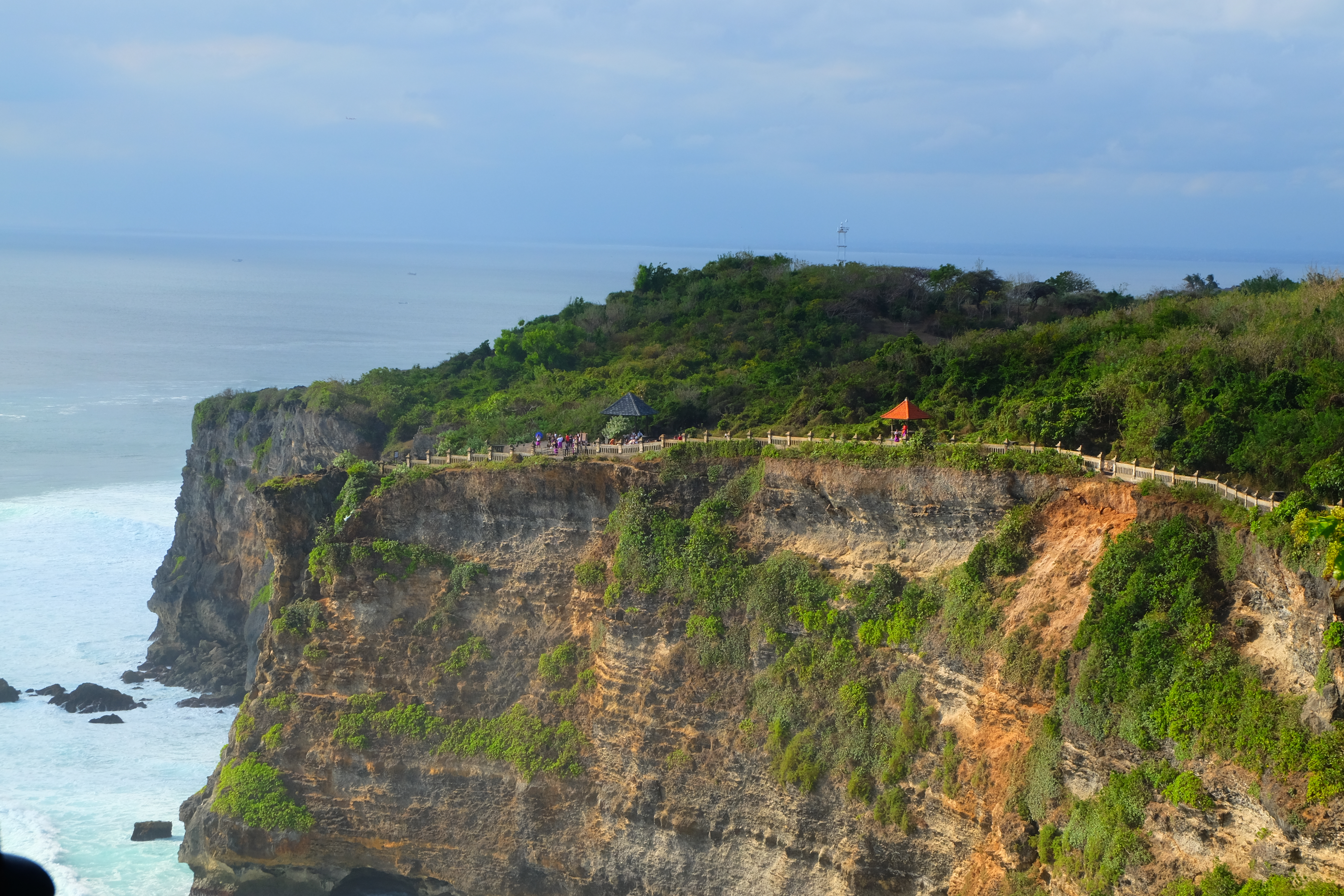
Coastal path near the Uluwatu temple overlooking the Indian ocean

== Geology ==
Visible in the Bukit Peninsula are layers of tertiary limestone resulting from the tectonic subduction of the Indo-Australian Plate under the Eurasian Plate, bringing it above sea level.

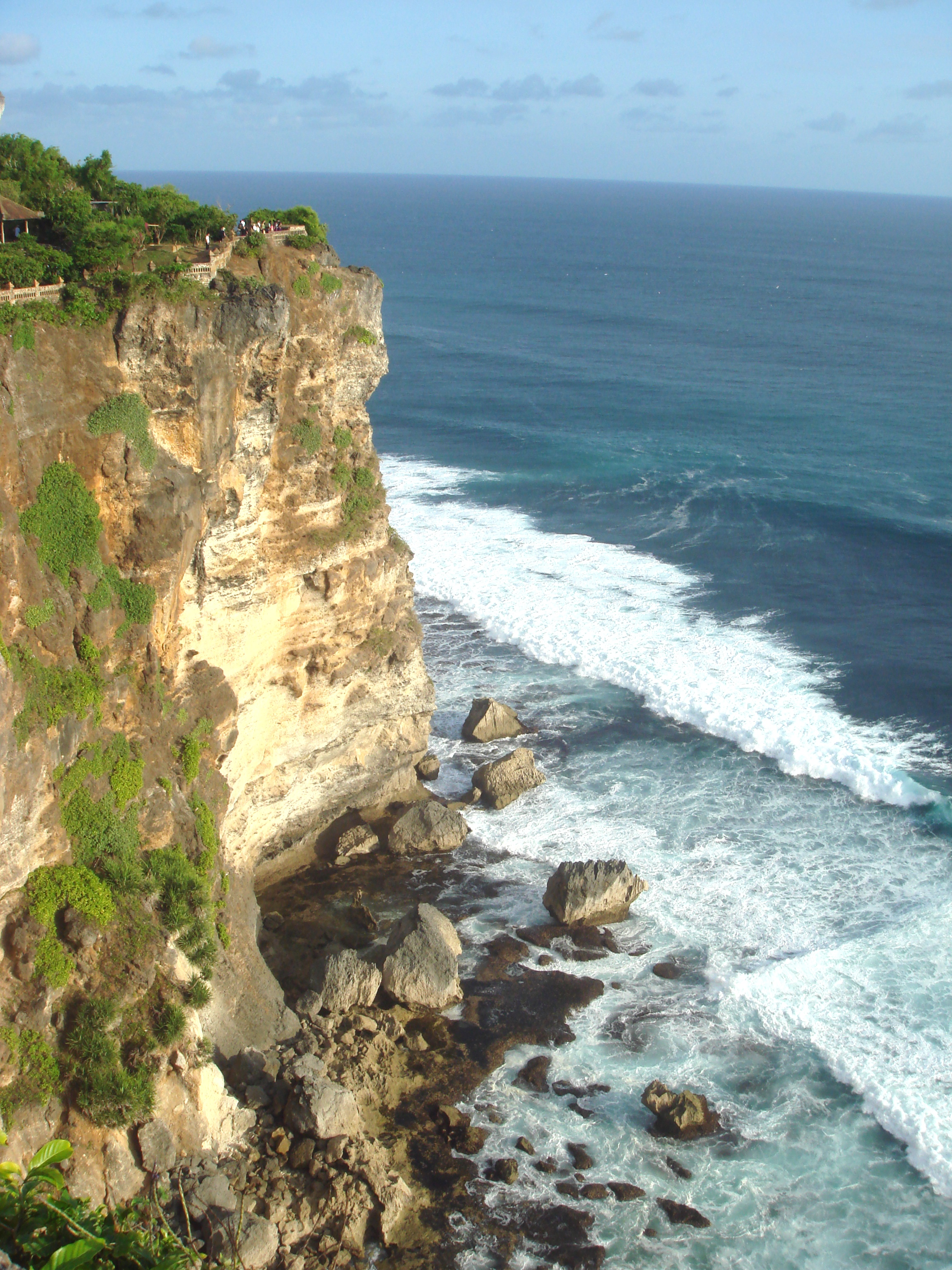
Tertiary limestone ocean floors, lifted by subduction, from the Bukit Peninsula, here visible with the cliffs of Uluwatu.

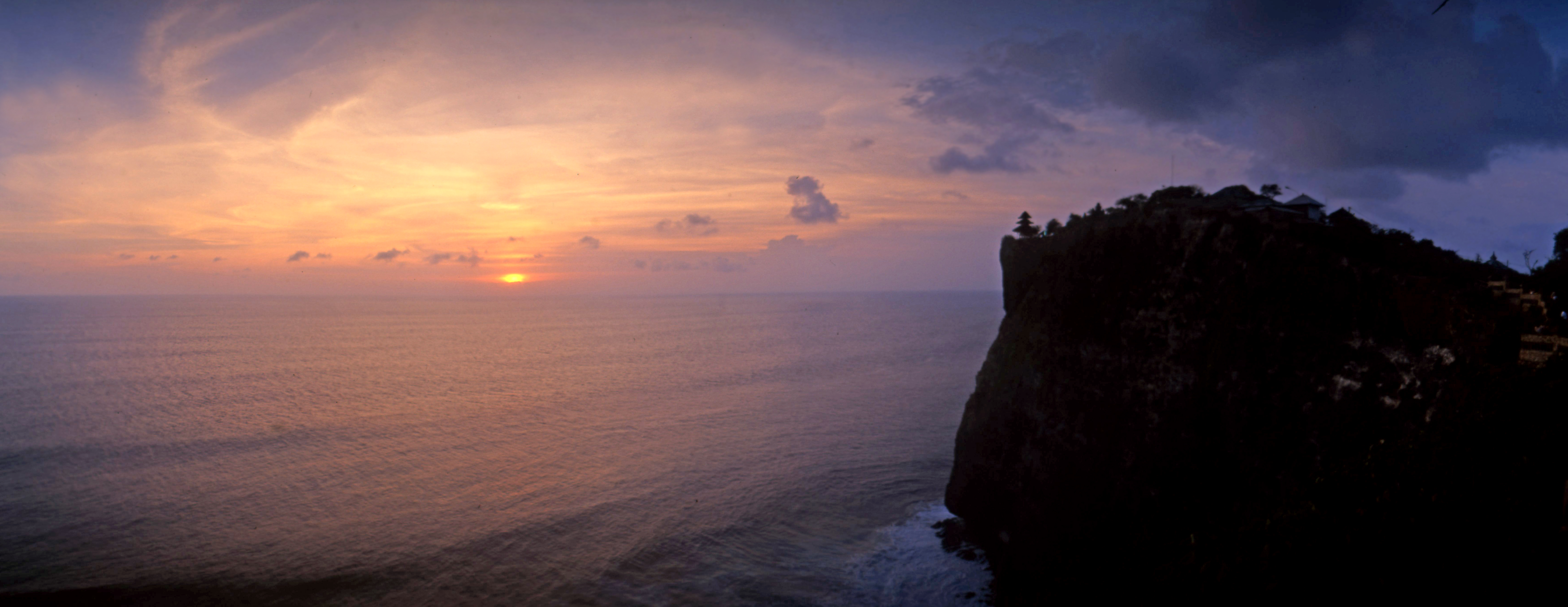
Sunset over Uluwatu temple

== Uluwatu temple ==
The Uluwatu temple (Pura Luhur Uluwatu) is one of nine directional temples of Bali, found 70 metres (230 ft) up at the top of the rock at the southwest most point of the peninsula. The temple is believed to protect Bali against evil.

== Surfing ==
Uluwatu was "discovered" as a surfing destination in 1972, due to the making of Morning of the Earth, a 1971 surf film by Alby Falzon and David Elfick considered a classic amongst surf enthusiasts. The original goal of the film was to show waves around Kuta. After a few days of shooting around Kuta beach, they found Uluwatu. To get to Uluwatu requires descending down the temple and emerging through the two rocks at the base of the cave, at the beach of Uluwatu. At the time, there were no roads leading to the beach, which meant that surfers had to walk with all the supplies they would need. Steve Cooney surfed the first wave in Uluwatu history, capturing it on film for Morning of the Earth at age 15. After the film's release on 25 February 1972, Uluwatu received immediate attention from surfers across the globe. Today Uluwatu is one of the most popular surf destinations in all of Bali. With surfers visiting from all over the world and with the advancement in video technology there has been some beautiful aerial footage showcasing Uluwatu from the air. Uluwatu best conditions: a southwest groundswell, with mid to high tide for the inner peaks and low tide for outside corner.

Locals on the island believe that Gods have blessed the surfers who surf the Uluwatu wave, because of how divine and perfect the waves there are.

=== Wave breaks ===
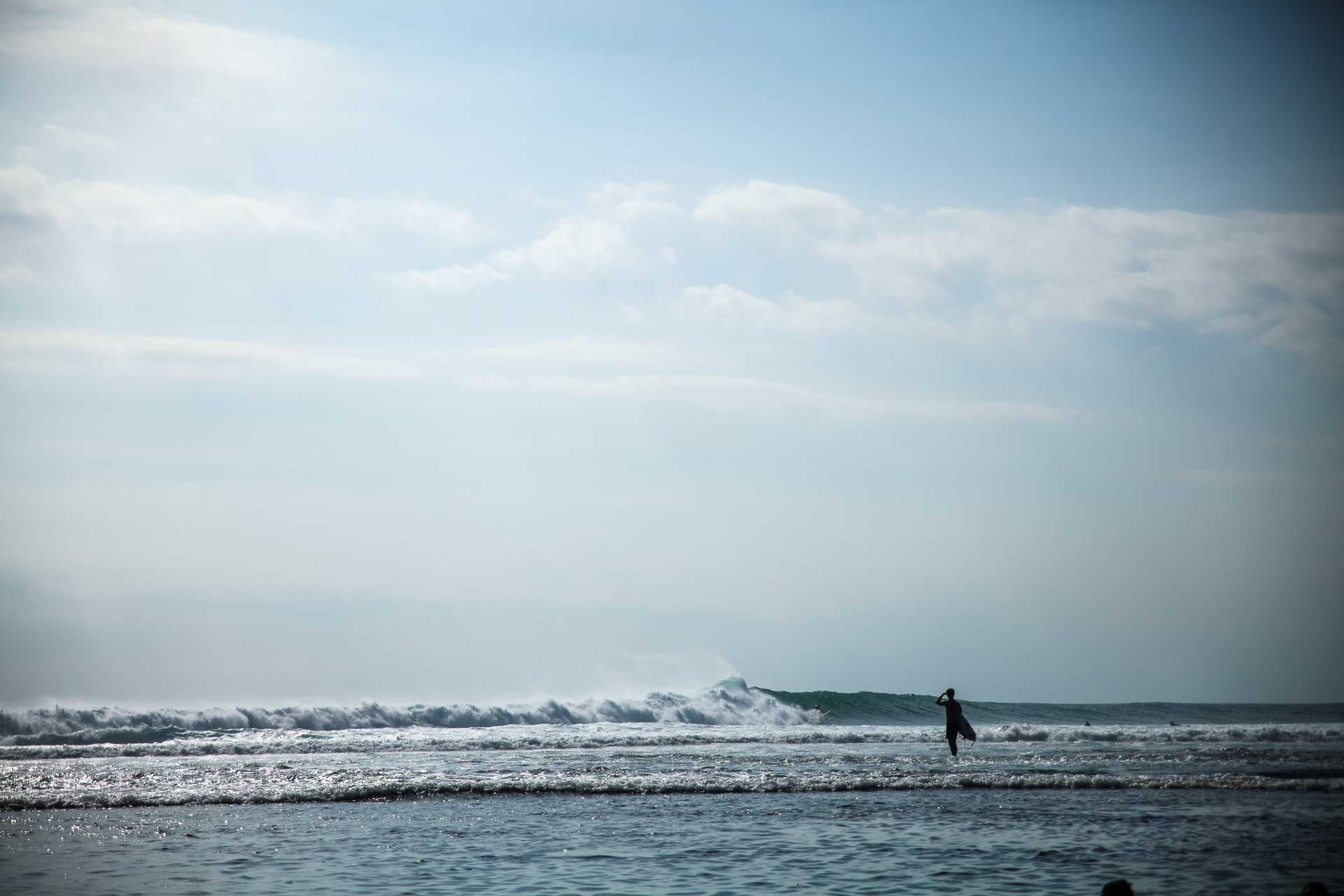
Surf break at Uluwatu.

The series of wave breaks includes five breaks, with (from top to bottom): The Bombie, Temples, Outside Corner, Racetracks, and The Peak.

==== Bombie ====
Bombie is the first of the five breaks in the Uluwatu series, located on the outer reef. Bombie is characterized by a high power wave, often resulting in broken surfboards and snapping leashes. On bigger swell events, the wave can reach up to 20 feet. With fairly consistent surf year round, the primary season for the Bombie occurs from May to October when the dry season with southeast winds prevail. The bombie is characterized by groundswells coming in with a southwest swell direction, and features a left breaking reef.

==== Temples ====
Temples received its name from an old temple on the foreground of the cliff. It is the second wave break in the series. This wave is recognized by the heavy amount of swell it receives. It is not a highly popular wave among surfers because it takes more effort to get out to it. However, there is a strong crew of expats and local surfers there and proper etiquette is required at all time.

==== Outside Corner ====
Next in line is Outside Corner, making this the other outer reef portion of Uluwatu. Outside Corner is next in line to The Peak and Racetracks, connecting them as swells pick up. During low tide, experiencing breaks can be expected on the biggest swells, but not before reaching 6 feet (1.8 m). Some of the waves during this time will build up, reaching 15 feet (4.6 m). This makes for a ride that covers approximately 300 yards (270 m).

==== Racetracks ====
Racetracks makes for an incredibly fast ride, with low tide often acknowledged as its prime time. During low tide, large barrels form at the end of the ride, and the water is extremely shallow here. Surfers are often known to dry dock on the reef at the end of the ride. However, the barrels may be more navigable during mid tide, and surfers are more likely to reach the end of the ride with success.

==== The Peak ====
Last in the series of break, The Peak is located right at the base of the cave, making this the entry and exit point of Uluwatu. The Peak operates well at every tide stage. Coming in best at high tide this wave makes for many hollow barreling waves. Unlike high tide, low tide at The Peak is known for closing out. The Peak has a reef break. Winds from the southeast make the most ideal waves. It is key to have a board the size of 6’8-7’4 while surfing this wave.

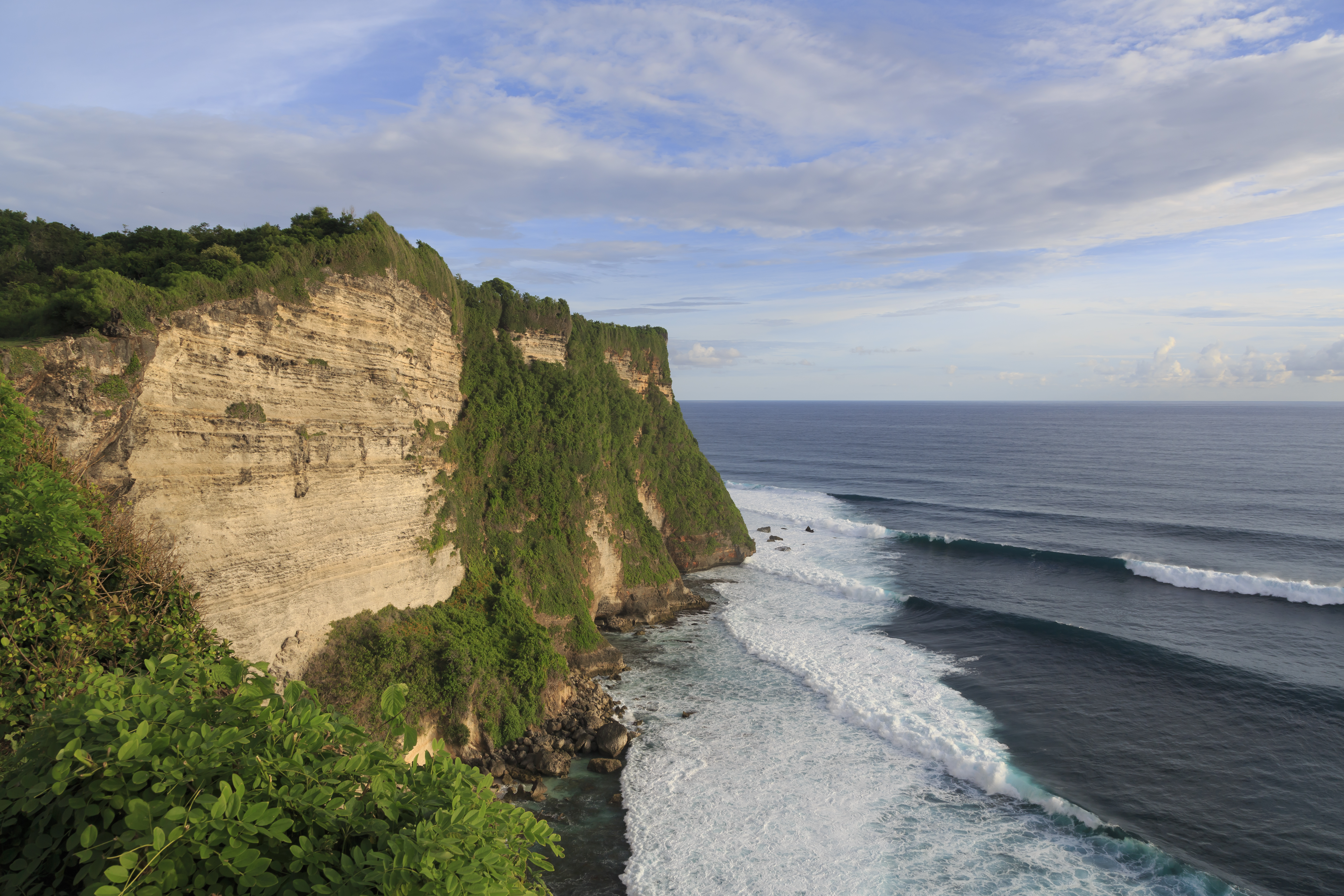
Ocean swells at Uluwatu

=== Swells ===
Due to deep-water channels on both sides of the Bukit Peninsula, swells are mainly found there. Strong currents make for larger swells at low tide. During these lower tides and large swells, The Peak, Racetracks, and Temples are all under white water, and Bombie and Outside Corner take the swells, creating 15 feet (4.6 m) waves. At high tide, small swells will be more prevalent, creating barrels.

== Transportation ==
The closest airport to Uluwatu is Ngurah Rai International Airport in Denpasar, 21 miles (34 km) north from Uluwatu. There are 41 airlines that depart out of the airport, and the airport offers nonstop flights to 50 cities every week. There is a minimum of 966 domestic flights and 889 international flights per week departing from it.

== Tourism and development ==
In recent decades, Uluwatu has undergone rapid tourism-driven development, transforming from a sparsely populated coastal area into one of Bali's most prominent luxury destinations. The region now features numerous high-end resorts, boutique hotels, and private villas built along the limstone cliffs, as well as beach clubs and restaurants that cater to international visitors.

While this growth has significantly boosted the local economy, it has also raised concerns about environmental pressure on the fragile coastal ecosystem, increased traffic congestion, and the long-term sustainability of large-scale construction in the area. Authorities and community groups have debated how to balance continued tourism investment with cultural preservation and environmental protection.
