= Captain Goodvibes =

Fictional character

Publication information
- Publisher: Tracks Publishing Company; Soundtracts Publishing; Flying Pineapple Media
- First appearance: May 1973
- First comic appearance: Whole Earth Pigalogue (Tracks Publishing Company, 1975)
- Created by: Tony Edwards
- Voiced by: Tony Edwards

In-story information
- Species: Pig
- Place of origin: Earth
- Notable aliases: The Pig of Steel

Captain Goodvibes, a.k.a. the Pig of Steel, is the creation of Australian cartoonist Tony Edwards and an icon of Australian surfing culture from the 1970s. In 1992 Captain Goodvibes was named by Australia's Surfing Life magazine as one of "Australia's 50 Most Influential Surfers." The character was inspired by American cartoonist Gilbert Shelton's underground comix character, Wonder Wart-Hog, a.k.a. the "Hog of Steel."

== Fictional character biography ==
Captain Goodvibes started life as a pork chop, mutated by a chance nuclear plant explosion. According to The Encyclopedia of Surfing, Goodvibes is a "hard-drinking, drug-taking, straight-talking pig with a tunnel-shaped snout.

== Origin and publication history ==
The Goodvibes cartoons were first published in Australian surfing magazine Tracks in May 1973 and appeared regularly until July 1981. Their popularity led to the publication of several Goodvibes comic books, including the Whole Earth Pigalogue (Tracks Publishing Company, 1975), Captain Goodvibes Strange Tales (Tracks Publishing Company, 1975) and Captain Goodvibes Porkarama (Soundtracts Publishing, 1980).

In 2011 an anthology of the comic strip, Captain Goodvibes — My Life As A Pork Chop, 1973-1981, was published by Flying Pineapple Media.

== In other media ==
Captain Goodvibes maxi single Mutants of Modern Disco, 1978.

Captain Goodvibes' popularity led to publication in calendars, a short film — Hot to Trot (1977), co-written by Ian Watson and Tony Barrell — and a maxi-single record, Mutants of Modern Disco, in 1978. Captain Goodvibes also had a cinematic cameo in the 1973 surfing documentary, Crystal Voyager, appearing in a brief animated sequence during the film.

Goodvibes starred in a radio series on Sydney radio station Double J (now Triple J) voiced by Tony Edwards and Tony Barrell.
