= Tony Hussein Hinde =

Australian–born Maldivian surfer (1983–2008)

- Born: Tony Hinde; 1953; Maroubra, New South Wales, Australia
- Died: 27 May 2008; Kanuhuraa, Kaafu Atoll, Maldives
- Burial place: Mollymook cemetery
- Citizenship: Australia; Maldives
- Known for: Father of Maldivian surfing
- Spouse: Zulfa (m. 1983; died 2008)
- Children: 2

Tony Hussein Hinde (1953 – 27 May 2008; born Tony Hinde) was an Australian-born Maldivian surfer and surfing pioneer. Hinde is considered to be the "father of surfing in the Maldives." He is co-credited with discovering the surfing potential in the Maldives, along with Australian surfer Mark Scanlon, and kick-starting the nation's emerging tourism industry.

== Shipwrecked in the Maldives ==
In December 1973, Hinde and fellow Aussie surfer Mark Scanlon were shipwrecked on Helengeli Reef in the Maldives aboard the Whitewings, a ketch which they were hired as crewmembers. They were originally planning to go to Africa from Sri Lanka. Hinde and Scanlon spent several unplanned months in the Maldives repairing the boat. However, the pair quickly discovered how good the surfing potential was in the Maldives and decided to stay in the country.

In the mid-1980s Hinde opened Atoll Adventures, a surfing camp in Tari village, in response to plans by foreign investor to open resorts in the area. Hinde continued to run the surfing camp and hotel, which changes its name to Dhonveli Beach & Spa in early 2000. It is now known as Chaaya Dhonveli, or Dhonveli Beach.

== Death ==
Tony Hussein Hinde died on 27 May 2008 while surfing at Pasta Point in Malé Atoll in the Maldives at the age of 55. He suffered an apparent heart attack after riding a wave. He was found floating face down in the water, but CPR failed to resuscitate him. He was buried at Mollymook cemetery in his native New South Wales, Australia on 3 June 2008. Local Maldivian and foreign surfers held a memorial at Varunulaa Raalhugandu, the main surfing spot in the capital city of Malé, and at Pasta Point on 8 June.

The Dhivehi Observer, a Maldivian newspaper based in the United Kingdom, said of Hinde that "In fact most Maldivians think he is a Maldivian but is an Australian who has bridged that cultural gap" (between the two countries).

A film called "Serendipity" was launched that tells the story of Hinde and retraces his steps in the Maldives. Hinde's friends and other Aussie surfers such as Bob McTavish, Alby Falzon, Wayne Bartholomew contributed to the film.

== Personal life ==
Hinde became a Maldivian citizen and converted to Islam, adding Hussein to his name. He married a Maldivian woman named Zulfa on 27 May 1983. Zulfa died in January 2008 and they had two children, Mishal and Ashley.
