= Bob McTavish =

Australian surfboard designer (born 1944)

- Born: 1944 (age 81–82); Mackay, Queensland, Australia
- Known for: Shortboard design

Bob McTavish (born 1944) is an Australian surfboard designer. He is often credited with the invention of the V-bottom surfboard and was one of a number of pioneering shapers considered instrumental in the development of shortboard surfing.

== Early life and education ==
Born in Mackay, Queensland in 1944, Bob McTavish began surfing at the age of twelve.

He dropped out of school at 15, and moved to Sydney, New South Wales.

In 1963, McTavish famously stowed away in an ocean liner bound for Hawaii. He spent five weeks in Hawaii before being deported.

== Surfing ==
McTavish began surfing on a 16-foot (4.8m) plywood paddleboard.

McTavish won the Qld State titles in 1964-66 and finished third in the Nationals behind Midget Farrelly and Nat Young, after which he abandoned competitive surfing. McTavish was a dynamic surfer eschewing the longboard style of surfing that was dominant at the time. Greg Noll, Joe Quigg were instrumental to him in his surf board shaping.

== Shaping ==
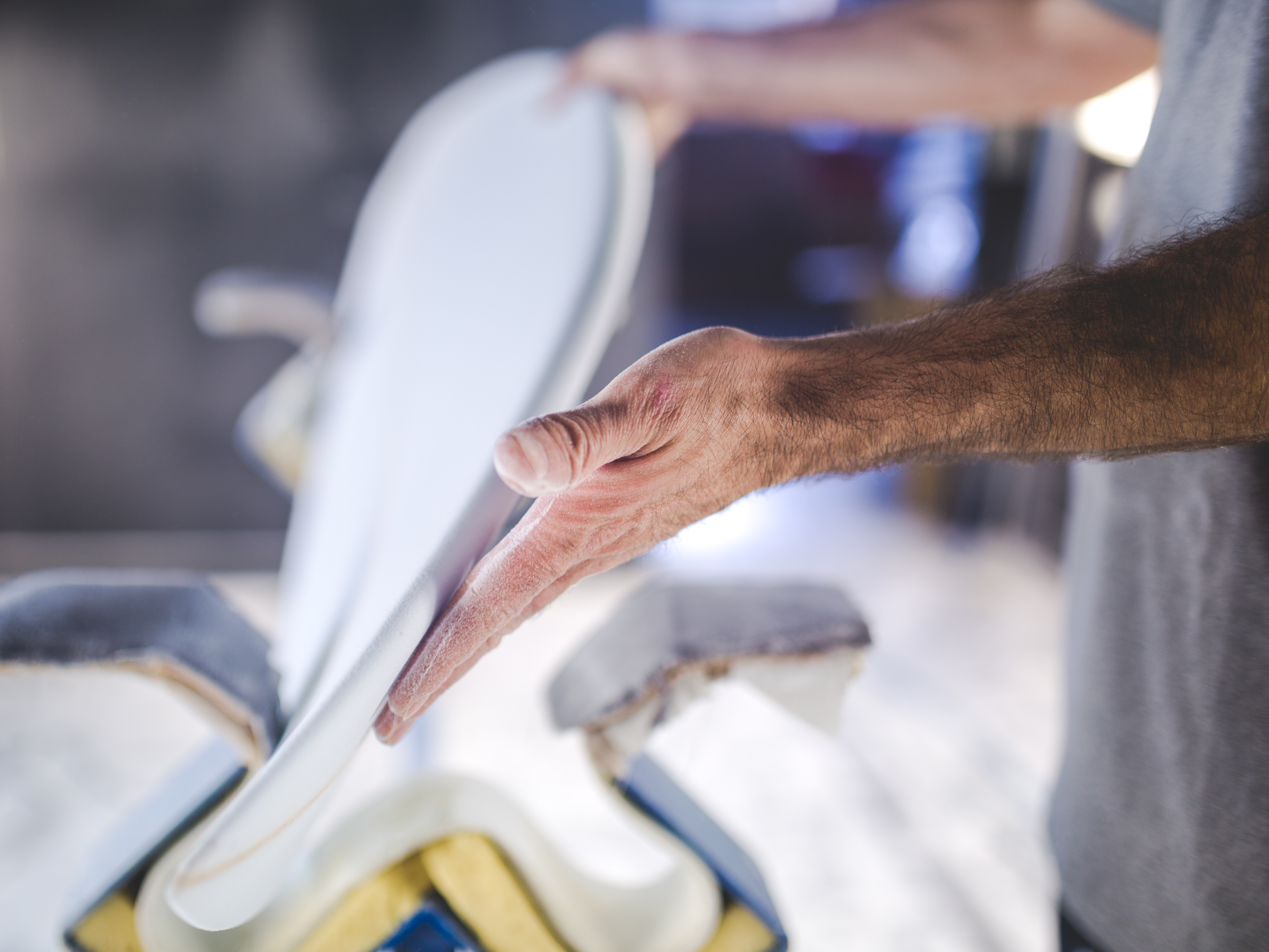
Handmade surfboard (Unsplash)

From 1961 onwards McTavish worked for surfboard labels including Scott Dillon, Dale, Hayden, Bob Davie, Morey-Pope, Keyo, and Cord. He worked alongside the Australian foam-core innovator Barry Bennett at his factory in Brookvale in 1972.

Meanwhile, he was developing his eponymous brand, 'McTavish'. His 1972 model, the 'Bluebird', has been described as the world's first production short-board, resulting in thousands being produced until 1979.

In 1989 McTavish introduced Pro Circuit boards, which created machine-moulded replicas of the boards ridden by professional surfers.

In the mid-1990s McTavish began producing 'Big M' longboards, which have a factory and retail operation in Byron Bay.

McTavish was the inaugural recipient of the FCS Legend Shaper Award.

=== Shortboard evolution ===
It is the generally accepted view that McTavish, influenced by California kneeboarder George Greenough, was responsible for starting the shortboard revolution with the development of the short, wide-tailed vee-bottom design of surfboard in 1966.

The vee-bottom design allowed surfers to go up the face of a wave rather than simply race away from a breaking curl. It has been suggested that without his contributions, the revolutionary nature of shortboard surfing wouldn't have been as effective.

Hawaiian Dick Brewer claims the vee-bottom design originated with him in Hawaii. Midget Farrelly claimed he shaped a vee-bottom prior to McTavish; however McTavish's central role in the shortboard revolution is acknowledged by the American surfers Greg Noll, Skip Frye, and Mike Hynson.

== Recognition ==
McTavish appeared in around 10 surf movies in the 1960s and 1970s.

In 1992, Australia's Surfing Life magazine named McTavish the "Most Influential Shaper of All Time".

In 1996, he was inducted into the Australian Surfing Hall of Fame.

== Personal life ==
In the 1970s, McTavish became a Jehovah’s Witness.

== Publications ==
- Stoked! (2009). Hyams Publishing. ISBN 978-097-757-986-0
- More Stoked! (2013) Harper Collins. ISBN 978-073-229-676-6
