= G. Wayne Thomas =

- Also known as: Wayne Thomas
- Born: Graham Wayne Thomas

G. Wayne Thomas is a New Zealand-born Australian-based musician, producer and songwriter. His 1972 single, "Open Up Your Heart"/"Morning of the Earth", reached #21 on the Australian singles chart.

Thomas was born in Auckland, New Zealand. He moved to Australia in 1968 and started writing music for commercials. He signed with Warner Bros. Records, released a single in 1971, and started working as a producer. He produced the soundtrack to the surf movie Morning of the Earth, changing what was going to be a Tamam Shud album into a "various-artists" record. It featured Tamam Shud, Terry Hannigan, Brian Cadd, John J. Francis and Peter Howe, as well as three G. Wayne Thomas tracks. The soundtrack was released in 1972 along with a single from the album, "Open Up Your Heart"/"Morning of the Earth".

In 1972, Thomas put together a band called "Duck", to record an album. The band originally comprised Jon English, Bobbi Marchini, John Robinson, Bobby Gebert, Larry Duryea, Teddy Toi and Steve Webb. They released an album of covers, Laid, which was produced by Thomas.

Thomas started his own label, Warm & Genuine, and released a self-titled album in 1973. He followed that up with a soundtrack for the 1973 Australian surf film, Crystal Voyager, putting together a studio band called the Crystal Voyager Band, comprising Thomas, Bobby Gebert, Mick Liber, Rod Coe and John Proud. Thomas's last release on Warm & Genuine was in 1975, after which he signed with Polydor.

In 1979–80, he worked in a duo with Peter Bailey and together they released an album, Missing Persons, as well as four singles.

== Discography ==
=== Albums ===
Title	Details
G. Wayne Thomas	Released: 1973; Label: Warm & Genuine (2907005)
Crystal Voyager	Released: 1973; Label: Warm & Genuine (2907010)
Missing Persons (as Thomas and Bailey)	Released: 1979; Label: Polydor (2907054)

=== EPs ===
Title	Details
Open Your Hear	Released: 1973; Label: Warner Bros. Records (EPW-208)

=== Singles ===
List of singles, with Australian chart positions
Year	Title	Peak chart positions	Album
Year	Title	AUS	Album
1971	"Take It Easy"/"You're Not Alone"	58	G. Wayne Thomas
1972	"Open Up Your Heart"/"Morning of the Earth"	21	G. Wayne Thomas
1973	"Everything in You"/"Call My Name"	47	G. Wayne Thomas
1973	"Hollywood"/"Morning Light" (with The Crystal Voyager Band)	-	Crystal Voyager
1973	"Changes"/"Into the Blue" (with The Crystal Voyager Band)	-	Crystal Voyager
1974	"Gypsy Shoes"/"Clouds Cry" (with The Crystal Voyager Band)	-	Crystal Voyager
1975	"Mercy for the Innocent"/"Junkyard"	-	non album single
1975	"Summer Days"/"Fly Away"	-	non album single
1976	"Just to Love You"/"How Can I Tell You?"	58	non album single
1979	"The Last Laugh"/"It's Alright" (as Thomas and Bailey)	-	Missing Persons
1979	"Missing Persons"/"Loving You"	-	Missing Persons
1980	"I Don't Want to Spoil Your Party"/"Half Way Home" (as Thomas and Bailey)	-	Missing Persons
1980	"Tobacco Road"/"They Loved Their Lives Away"	-	non album single
