= Kneeboard (disambiguation) =

Kneeboard may refer to:

- Kneeboard, a surfboard ridden in a kneeling stance
- Pilot's kneeboard, a flight accessory for pilots to hold maps, etc.
- Kneeboard, or kickboard, part of a pedal keyboard
