= Tim Baker (journalist) =

Australian surfer and sportswriter

Tim Baker is an Australian journalist specialising in surf culture. He has twice received the Australian Surfing Hall of Fame Culture Award, and is a former editor of Tracks and Australia's Surfing Life magazines. His work has appeared in a range of publications, including Rolling Stone, GQ, Inside Sport, the Sydney Morning Herald, The Australian Way, Playboy, the Australian Financial Review, The Bulletin, as well as numerous surfing magazines. He is the best-selling author of four books on surfing, including Bustin’ Down The Door (HarperCollins, 1996, now in its eighth print run; see also the 2008 film of the same name), High Surf (HarperCollins, 2007), Occy (Random House, 2008), Surf For Your Life with Mick Fanning (Random House, 2009) and The Rip Curl Story (Penguin, 2019). He is currently a senior contributor to Surfing World, Surfing Life, Surfer’s Path (UK), and the Surfers Journal.

Baker has appeared at the Sydney, Byron Bay, and Margaret River writers' festivals and the Sunshine Coast's Reality Bites Festival, and has conducted writing workshops at the Hunter, Sydney and Northern Rivers Writers Centres. He has worked in the media and surfing magazines for 25 years and has surfed and travelled throughout Australia, Indonesia, Hawaii, Central and South America, North America, Europe, Fiji, Tahiti, and Sri Lanka. He lives in Currumbin, Queensland, with his wife and two children, and is currently working on a surfing-based novel.

== Bibliography ==
- Baker, Tim (2022). Patting the Shark. Penguin. ISBN 9781760898915.
- Baker, Tim (2019). The Rip Curl Story. Penguin.
- Baker, Tim; Bartholomew, Wayne (1996). Bustin' Down the Door. HarperCollins.
- Baker, Tim (2007). Go Surf. Dorling Kindersley. (book and DVD)
