= Brenden Margieson =

Australian surfer (born 1972)

- Margieson in 2020
- Born: 3 July 1972 (age 54); Sydney, Australia
- Height: 6 ft 0 in (183 cm)
- Surfing career
- Nickname: Margo
- Website: www.instagram.com/margomargs
- Sport: Surfing
- Major achievements: • 1996 winner Nias Indonesian Pro • 2 times voted Best Free-Surfer in the World (1998 and 1999) by Australian Surfing Life Magazine • Finalist at ISA World Titles France 1992 • Winner of the Heritage Heat - WSL Boost Mobile Pro Gold Coast 2020 • Legends Division Champion Burleigh Heads Boardriders Single Fin 2023

Surfing specifications
- Stance: Natural (regular) foot
- Shaper: Present: Album Surf

Brenden Margieson, born on July 3, 1972, is a former Australian professional surfer, widely recognized as one of the pioneering free surfers to achieve substantial financial success in the sport. In 1996, he secured victory at the inaugural Nias Indonesian Pro and earned the title of "Best free-surfer in the world" in consecutive years (1998 and 1999) according to Australia's Surfing Life. Known by the moniker "Margo", he is often praised for his stylish regular foot, characterized by a smooth and powerful technique, making him a captivating presence in the world of surfing. Margieson remains a cherished figure in Australian surfing.

== Life and career ==
Brenden Margieson was born in Sydney on July 3, 1972, and relocated to Byron Bay at the age of 5. Following in the footsteps of his father, Rodney Margieson, who was an avid surfer, Brenden entered the surfing scene at 18. Recognizing his potential, Billabong sponsored him, providing the support necessary for him to pursue his dreams.

Margieson's career predominantly involved extensive travel to remote locations, funded by sponsors, where he engaged in editorial photoshoots for both Australian and international surfing publications. He graced the covers of numerous magazines, including Tracks, Waves, Surfing Life, Surfer, and Surfing. Additionally, he has been featured in over a dozen surfing videos, collaborating with renowned figures such as Jack McCoy and Justin Gane.

In 2003, Justin Gane Productions released Wanderjahr: The Margo Project, a documentary offering insights into the life and journeys of Brenden 'Margo' Margieson. The film delves into the reasons behind Margo's influence on professional surfing, highlighting his role in opening doors for future surfers by prioritizing the joy of surfing over competitive endeavours.

== Personal life ==
Brenden Margieson has two children from his first marriage. His eldest son, Micah Margieson, born on February 25, 2001, has followed in his father's footsteps. In 2018, Micah secured the Australian Junior Title, showcasing powerful maneuvers reminiscent of his father's style while adding his distinctive touch.

As of the present, Margo resides on the east coast of Australia with his current wife, Lorena Margieson. He continues to exhibit his distinctive surfing style during occasional surfing sessions.

== Filmography ==
Surfer
Title	Year
The Green Iguana	1992
The Sons of Fun	1993
The Billabong Challenge	1995
Unleashed	1995
Pulse	1996
Pulse 2	1997
Odyssey	1998
Activ8	2001
Pulse 2001	2001
Tempo	2002
Wanderjahr: The Margo Project	2003
Frame Lines	2004
The Free Way	2005
