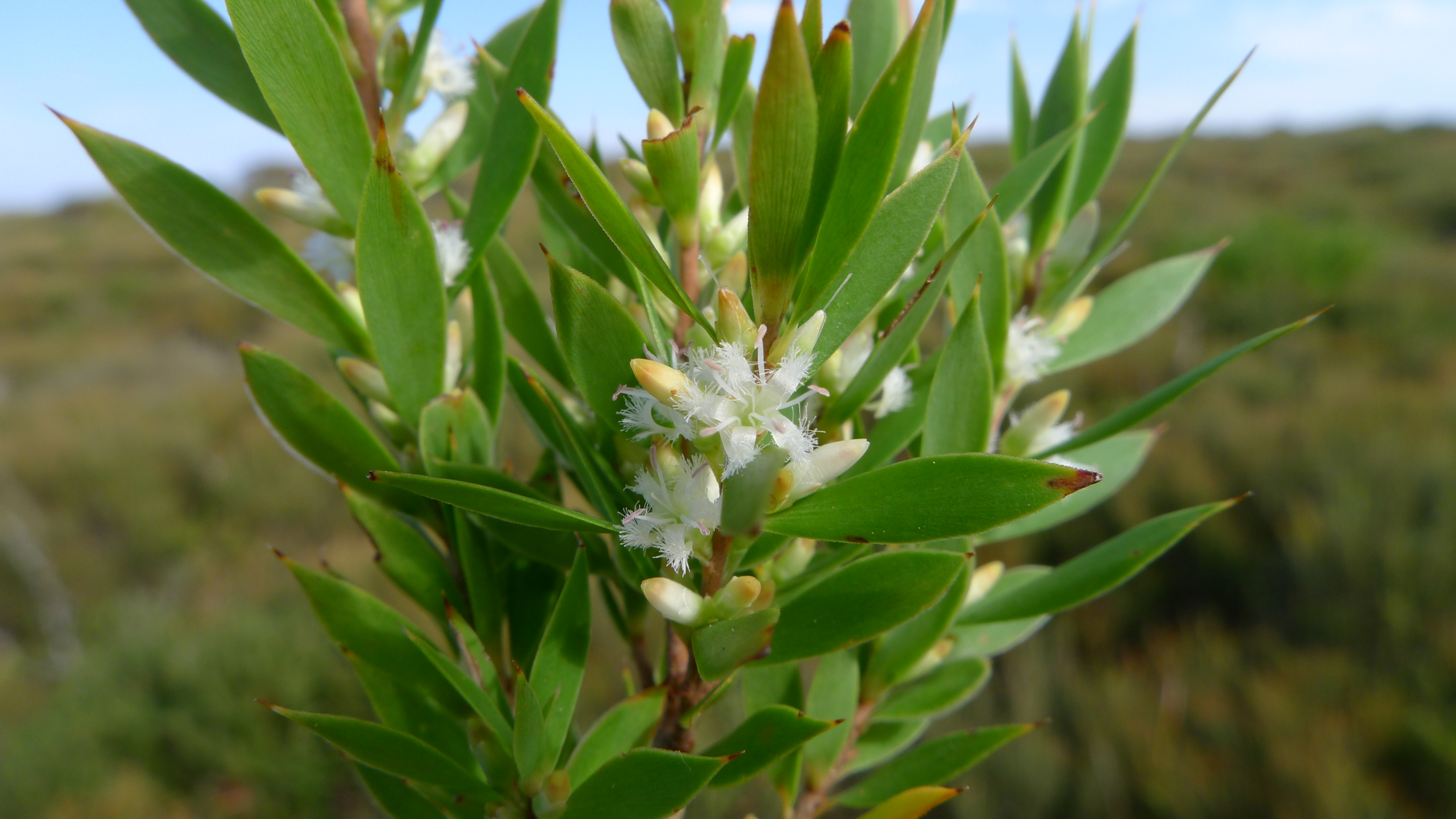
- Styphelia esquamata in Botany Bay National Park

Scientific classification
- Kingdom: Plantae
- Clade: Tracheophytes
- Clade: Angiosperms
- Clade: Eudicots
- Clade: Asterids
- Order: Ericales
- Family: Ericaceae
- Genus: Styphelia
- Species: S. esquamata

Binomial name
- Styphelia esquamata (R.Br.) Spreng.
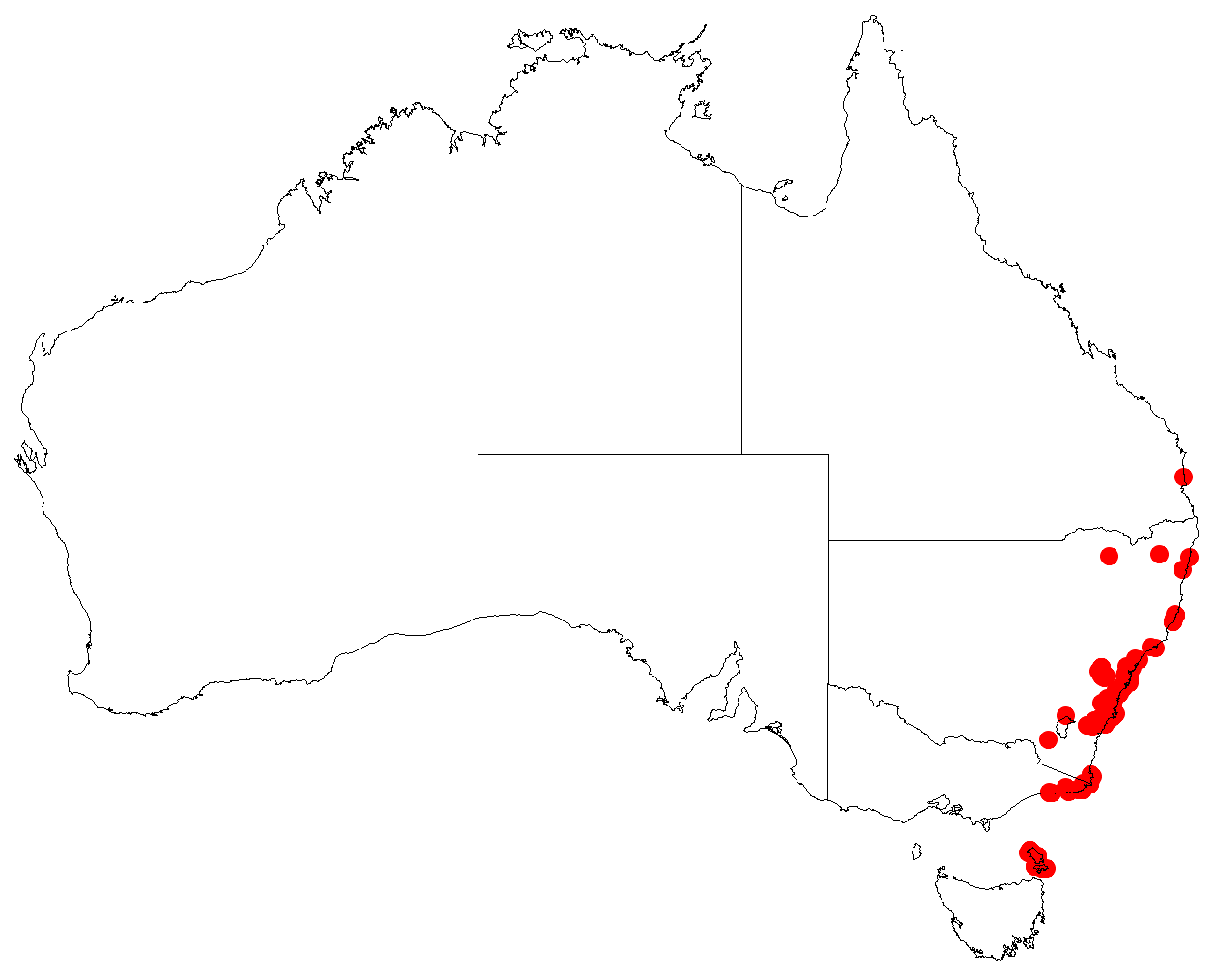
- Occurrence data from AVH

Synonyms
- Leucopogon esquamatus R.Br.; Phanerandra esquamata (R.Br.) Stschegl.; Leucopogon appressus DC. not validly publ.; Leucopogon fastigiatus (Spreng.) G.Don; Leucopogon fastigiatus Sieber ex Spreng. not validly publ.; Leucopogon squamatus Steud.; Styphelia fastigiata Spreng.

= Styphelia esquamata =

Swamp beard-heath

Species of flowering plant

Styphelia esquamata, commonly known as the swamp beard-heath, is a species of flowering plant in the heath family Ericaceae and is endemic to south-eastern Australia. It is a slender shrub with mainly elliptic leaves, and short-lived white, tube-shaped flowers arranged singly or in pairs in upper leaf axils.

== Description ==
Styphelia esquamata is an erect, leafy shrub that typically grows to a height of 0.2–1 m (7.9 in – 3 ft 3.4 in) and has glabrous branchlets. Its leaves are erect, elliptic to narrowly so, sometimes egg-shaped with the narrower end towards the base, 7–15 mm (0.28–0.59 in) long and 2.0–3.3 mm (0.079–0.130 in) wide on a petiole about 1 mm (0.039 in) long. The lower surface of the leaves is paler than the upper surface and is faintly striated, the edges with minute teeth near the tip. The flowers are white, arranged singly or in pairs in upper leaf axils and are on an erect peduncle up to 1.5 mm (0.059 in) long with bracteoles 1.2–1.5 mm (0.047–0.059 in) long at the base. The sepals are egg-shaped and 2.1–2.5 mm (0.083–0.098 in) long, the petal tube 1.0–1.5 mm (0.039–0.059 in) long and densely bearded inside, the lobes 2.3–2.9 mm (0.091–0.114 in) long. Flowering occurs in August and September and the fruit is a glabrous, brown, cylindrical drupe 3.8–4.5 mm (0.15–0.18 in) long.

== Taxonomy ==
This species was first formally described in 1810 by Robert Brown, who gave it the name Leucopogon esquamatus in his Prodromus Florae Novae Hollandiae. In 1824, Kurt Polycarp Joachim Sprengel transferred the species to Styphelia as S. esquamata and that name is accepted by Plants of the World Online. The specific epithet (esquamata) means "without scales", possibly to distinguish it from other similar plants with scale-like leaves.

== Distribution and habitat ==
Swamp beard-heath usually grows in swampy heath, sometimes in forest or at the base of sandstone cliffs and is found in New South Wales south from Brooms Head near Angourie to poorly-drained near-coastal heath as far west as Marlo in north-eastern Victoria. It also grows on sandy headlands on Flinders and Cape Barren Islands in Tasmania.
