= Morning of the Earth =

- Directed by: Albert Falzon, David Elfick
- Produced by: David Elfick
- Starring: Terry Fitzgerald; Michael Peterson; Stephen Cooney; Nat Young; Rusty Miller; David Treloar
- Cinematography: Alby Falzon
- Edited by: Alby Falzon, Albie Thoms
- Music by: G. Wayne Thomas
- Release date: 25 February 1972
- Running time: 79 minutes
- Country: Australia
- Language: English
- Budget: A$40,000 (est.)

Morning of the Earth is a 1972 classic surf film by Albert Falzon and David Elfick.

The film's soundtrack was produced by G. Wayne Thomas and included music and songs by noted Australian music acts Tamam Shud, John J. Francis, Brian Cadd, Mike Rudd and G. Wayne Thomas. The record became the first Australian Gold soundtrack album. In October 2010, the soundtrack for Morning of the Earth was listed in the book, 100 Best Australian Albums.

The film portrays surfers living in spiritual harmony with nature, making their own boards (and homes) as they travelled in search of the perfect wave across Australia's north-east coast, Bali and Hawaii. The movie is regarded as one of the finest of its genre and noted as recording the first surfers to ride the waves at Uluwatu on the very southern tip of Bali and so bringing Bali to the attention of surfers around the world, as well as contributing to Bali becoming a major tourist destination.

== Background ==
Tamam Shud were recording tracks for the surf film Morning of the Earth including their song "First Things First". Their main lead singer, Lindsay Bjerre was having voice problems so they recorded the song using lead guitarist Tim Gaze; music producer G. Wayne Thomas was unhappy with Gaze's vocals and asked Broderick Smith (Carson) to fill in. According to Bjerre, Tamam Shud were not informed and only found out about the switch at the film's premiere; according to Smith, he had Tamam Shud's knowledge and permission.

== Locations featured ==
Australia:

- Kirra, Queensland
- Lennox Head, New South Wales
- Broken Head, New South Wales
- Angourie, New South Wales
- Whale Beach, New South Wales (Sydney)

Bali:

- Uluwatu

Hawaii:

- Rocky Point
- North Shore, Oahu

== Surfers featured ==
(In alphabetical order, incomplete.)

- Chris Brock
- Stephen Cooney
- Terry Fitzgerald
- Barry Kanaiaupuni
- Gerry Lopez
- Rusty Miller
- Michael Peterson
- Baddy Treloar
- Mark Warren
- Nat Young

== Soundtrack ==
1. "Morning of the Earth" – G. Wayne Thomas
2. "I'll Be Alright" – Terry Hannagan
3. "First Things First" – Tamam Shud
4. "Sure Feels Good" – Brian Cadd
5. "Open Up Your Heart" – G. Wayne Thomas
6. "Simple Ben" – John J. Francis
7. "Bali Waters" – Tamam Shud
8. "Making It on Your Own" – Brian Cadd
9. "Day Comes" – G. Wayne Thomas
10. "Sea the Swells" – Tamam Shud
11. "I'm Alive" – Peter Howe
12. "Come with Me" – Brian Cadd

== Certifications ==
Region	Certification	Certified units/sales
Australia (ARIA)	Gold	35,000^{^}
^{^} Shipments figures based on certification alone.
