= Love in Limbo =

- Directed by: David Elfick
- Written by: John Cundill
- Produced by: David Elfick
- Starring: Craig Adams; Aden Young; Russell Crowe; Martin Sacks
- Cinematography: Stephen F. Windon
- Edited by: Stuart Armstrong
- Music by: Peter Kaldor
- Production company: Palm Beach Productions
- Distributed by: Prism Leisure Corporation
- Release date: 20 May 1993
- Running time: 99 minutes
- Country: Australia
- Language: English
- Box office: A$74,448 (Australia)

Love in Limbo (released in the Philippines as Touch Me, Kiss Me, Love Me) is a 1993 Australian romantic comedy film directed and produced by David Elfick. The film stars Craig Adams, Aden Young and Russell Crowe. The film was released on 20 May 1993. Visually the film was heavily influenced by The Girl Can't Help It (1956). It was nominated for three awards by the Australian Film Institute in 1992.

== Cast ==
- Craig Adams as Ken Riddle
- Rhondda Findleton as Gwen Riddle
- Martin Sacks as Max Wiseman
- Aden Young as Barry McJannet
- Russell Crowe as Arthur Baskin
- Maya Stange as Ivy Riddle
- Samantha Murray as Maisie
- Bill Young as Uncle Herbert
- Leith Taylor as Mrs. Rutherford
- Jill Perryman as Aunt Dorry
- Robert van Mackelenberg as Headmaster
- Peter De Bari as Schoolboy
- Arianthe Galani as Mrs. Costanides
- Faye Metaxas as Mrs. Laventis
- Igor Sas as Maurice Hosking
- Rebekah Elmaloglou

== Release ==
Love in Limbo was released in Australia on 20 May 1993. In the Philippines, the film was released as Touch Me, Kiss Me, Love Me in November 1995.

=== Critical response ===
Rob Lowing, film critic for the Sydney Morning Herald rated the film two stars out of four. Lowing described the film as "unatmospheric but well-produced" and "laced with distressingly puerile Porky's-like humour". For Cinema Papers, Karl Quinn wrote, "To note that David Elfick's Love In Limbo is a beautifully-designed film is to point to both its greatest strength and its great weakness, for it is surely one of the best recent examples of the triumph of style over substance".

Margaret Pomeranz and David Stratton for SBS TV's The Movie Show both rated the film three stars out of five. In her review Pomeranz concluded, "Love in Limbo may not be ultimately, totally satisfying but it certainly has its share of entertaining moments". Stratton praised the production design, adding, "The acknowledgement to movies of the 50s is very clear here and very well done".

== See also ==
- Cinema of Australia
- Russell Crowe filmography
