= Tracks (magazine) =

Australian surf magazine

- Editor: Luke Kennedy
- Staff cartoonists: Tony Edwards (1973–1981)
- Former editors: Alby Falzon (1970-1975), Tim Baker (1989-1991)
- Categories: Humor magazine
- Frequency: Quarterly
- Format: Newsprint magazine
- Founder: Alby Falzon, John Witzig, David Elfick
- Founded: 1970
- First issue: October 1970; 56 years ago
- Company: Tracks Media Pty Ltd
- Based in: Sydney, Australia
- Language: English
- Website: www.tracksmag.com

Tracks is an Australian surf magazine published quarterly, promoting itself as "the surfers' bible." It is published by Nextmedia.

Tracks was established in October 1970 by Alby Falzon, John Witzig, and David Elfick, starting as a kind of counterculture tabloid, printed on newsprint and produced on Sydney's northern beaches. Since then it has grown to be a major surfing publication.

== History ==
Tracks was originally published by the Tracks Publishing Company.

Tracks published a cartoon series,"Captain Goodvibes", by Australian cartoonist Tony Edwards. The Captain Goodvibes cartoons were first published in May 1973 and appeared regularly until July 1981. The character became an icon of Australian surfing culture.

"Lash Clone" by Australian Author D. C. Greening appeared in the pages of Tracks during the 1980s, with Greening's later works, "Cosmic Surf Wars," appearing more recently.

Some time after 1987 the magazine was acquired by Next Publishing (now known as Nextmedia).

In July 1988 the magazine's title was updated from tracks to tRACKS.

In March 2000 the magazine changed format from the original newsprint size down to a tabloid size.

In January 2001 Tracks magazine was acquired by Tracks Media Pty Ltd from Nextmedia with Peter Stain as CEO and Director, Luke Kennedy as Editor-In-Chief, David Mulham as Director, Greg Copper as Director and Damian Martin as General Manager.

In June 2024 Tracks Media Pty Ltd sold 13.3% of the company via a public share offer through Birchal, an Australian Equity Crowdfunding platform.

== Tracks editors ==
- Alby Falzon 1970-1975
- John Witzig 1970-1972
- David Elfick 1970
- Phil Jarratt 1975-1977
- Paul Holmes 1978-1981
- Kirk Wilcox 1981-1984
- Nick Carroll 1984-1986
- Jon Ellis 1986-1988
- Tim Baker 1989-1991
- Gary Dunne 1991-1994
- Neil Ridgeway 1994-1997
- Wayne Dart 1997-2000
- Sean Doherty 2000-2008
- Luke Kennedy 2008-

== Controversy ==
In 2014, 13-year-old reader and surfer Olive Bowers wrote an open letter to the magazine pointing out sexism in the print and digital editions of the magazine. She pointed to the absence of female surfers and the presence of scantily-clad women not involved in surfing in the magazine.
