= Wooloweyah, New South Wales =

Wooloweyah New South Wales
- Coordinates: 29°29′S 153°18′E
- Population: 419 (SAL 2021)
- Postcode(s): 2464
- LGA(s): Clarence Valley
- State electorate(s): Clarence
- Federal division(s): Page

Wooloweyah is a small village on the northern coast of New South Wales, Australia. It is approximately five kilometres south of Yamba and approximately two kilometres west of Angourie. At the 2006 census, Wooloweyah had a population of 436.

Wooloweyah is named for the lake that the village borders. The word wooloweyah translates roughly to big cedar trees in the regional Aboriginal dialect. Its lake holds an estimated volume of 25,000 metric tons of water, and is home to 13 different species of fish, and 2 species of shark including the local wobbegong carpet shark.

Wooloweyah also has a tennis court, children's playground, a small soccer field as well as a community hall which is sometimes used to hold various types of functions.

Public transport is available to Wooloweyah. It is provided by a Busways which runs two bus stops
