= Kneeboard =

Surfboard ridden in a kneeling stance

Kneeboarding at Bear Lake, Utah

A kneeboard is a board ridden in a kneeling stance. Kneeboards are ridden in ocean surf, or while being towed behind a boat on a lake or river.

== Background ==
Kneeboard riders generally wear life jackets or wetsuits and catch the wave by paddling and kicking or dipping their hand into the water. Advantages to kneeboarding include an extremely low center of gravity, less wind resistance, the ability to ride higher and further back in the tubes, and taking off on a steeper part of the wave.

Towed kneeboarding is an offshoot of kneeboard surfing; kneeboard riders compete tricks, and expression session events. Towed kneeboards have a padded deck contoured to the shape of the shins and knees and a strap holds the rider in place. Towed kneeboarding declined in popularity with the advent of wakeboarding and other modern watersports. However, it still enjoys popularity among water skiers and newer models of the kneeboard remain in production. A kneeboard is a good piece of equipment to start with for boat-towed sports. The low center of gravity often makes it easier to use than a waterski or wakeboard, which both require standing up.

Surf kneeboard innovators include George Greenough, Steve Lis, Peter Crawford and Ron Romanosky. Till Wipperfuerth is one of the actual top performers in kneeboarding, since he became champion of the Tunilake Kneeboard Masters.

== See also ==
- Surfing
- Barefoot skiing
- Sit-down hydrofoil
