= Sit-down hydrofoil =

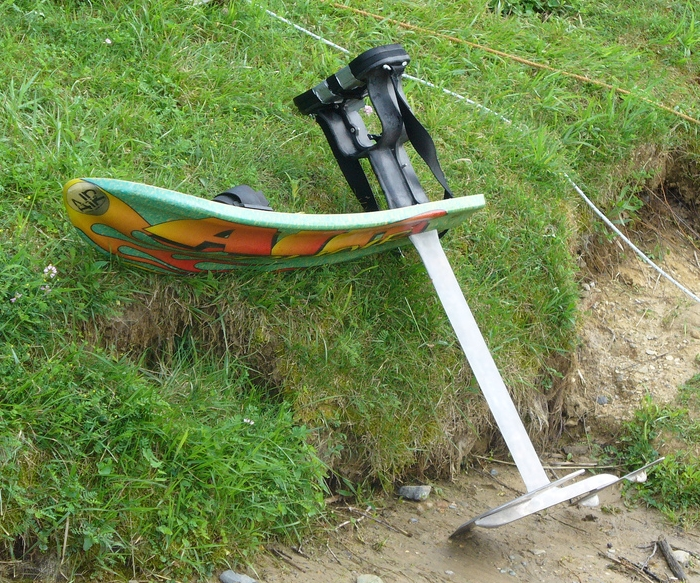
A sit-down hydrofoil

The sit-down hydrofoil, first developed in the late 1980s, is a variation on water skiing, a popular water sport. When towed at speed, by a powerful boat or some other device, the board of the hydrofoil 'flies' above the water surface and generally avoids contact with it, so the ride is largely unaffected by the wake or chop of the water and is relatively smooth. The air board is a modified hydrofoil where the skier stands up.

== History ==
Hydrofoils date back to the early 1900s, however, they were not part of a recreational sport. While the first hydrofoil boat was created in 1906 by Italian inventor Enrico Forlanini, the first waterski hydrofoil was invented in the early 1960s by Walter Woodward, an aeronautical engineer, with two skis attached to a bi-wing hydrofoil. In 1972, Mike Murphy and Bob Woolley added a bi-wing hydrofoil to a surfing kneeboard, then reduced the bi-wing to a single wing. Murphy and Woolley then applied the concept to sit-down hydrofoil, with Woolley riding the first "Sit Ski" in 1984. After various material changes, including the addition of a seat belt to keep rider and ride together and prevent separation collisions, they sold their first "Air Chair" in 1990. Advancements in materials and hydrofoil design have created stronger rigs, gentler rides (shock absorbers in the seat), more maneuverability, and boards that combine sit-down and stand-up (air board) for surfing.

== Sit-down hydrofoil components ==
- Seat (also referred to as the tower) - located directly above the hydrofoil and commonly made of aluminium. The seat comes with a seat belt to keep rider and ride together.
- Board - a molded ski, typically made of a fiberglass or carbon fiber resin. The board has two bindings connecting it to the rider's feet to allow for better control of the hydrofoil.
- Foil assembly - a long strut, usually around 3 ft (0.9 m) long, connected to a fuselage carrying a front wing (for lift) and a rear wing (for stability). This allows the rider to turn and go up and down.

=== Other equipment ===
- Towboat - any boat can be used, but a boat with a tower will help with height and jumping ability as riders begin to advance. For beginners, it is recommended to learn at 15 to 18 miles per hour (13 to 16 kn). Advanced riders may increase speed from 22–30 miles per hour (19–26 kn) in order to gain extra height and length on their jumps.
- Life jacket - use a jacket marked for water skiing
- Ski line - available at most boating stores; the line should be at least 75 ft (23 m) long
- Water sport helmet

== Use ==
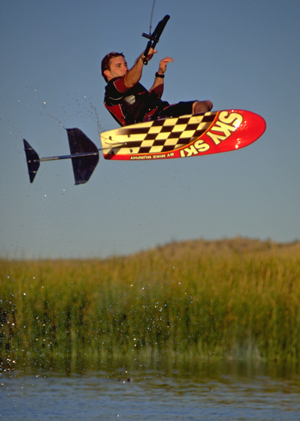
Sit-down hydrofoil rider performing a jump

Unlike water skiing or wakeboarding, a hydrofoiler's body and the board rise above the water, supported by a pair of front and rear hydrofoil wings which are still under the water. This reduces the drag of the water, allowing for both a smoother ride on rough water and a lesser need for strength.

The rider sits on the seat of the hydrofoil and is strapped in with a seat belt; their feet are strapped into bindings near the front of the board. When the rider is ready, the boat will start to tow the skier. The water flowing past the hydrofoil wings generates lift, which can be controlled by the rider to move the board up and down or side to side above the surface of the water. The rider must be centered over the post of the hydrofoil; small body movements will cause great reactions with the hydrofoil. In order to "float" upward, the rider leans back while maintaining balance to avoid pitching forward unexpectedly. To go back down, the rider leans forward or pushes down with the feet. Turning is accomplished by pointing the knees in the direction desired; the hydrofoil will follow. To jump, the rider leans even farther back. This will give the rider a somewhat stable base to perform aerial tricks, for example.

== Dangers ==
Submerged hazards such as trees can be struck by the hydrofoil as low as 3 feet below the surface of the water, causing the rider to fall without warning. Such a fall can be the same as colliding with an object, with the rider impacting the water or the foil. The tow rope can get tangled around the skier or equipment, creating a hazardous condition. After a fall, the skier remains strapped to the board; while it will turn upright quickly, there is always the possibility of drowning.

== See also ==
- Foilboard
- Paravane (water kite)
