= Mark Scanlon (surfer) =

Australian surfer (born 1955)

- Born: 1955 (age 70–71); Maroubra, Sydney, New South Wales, Australia
- Known for: Pioneering Maldivian surfing
- Spouse: Mandy Andrews

Mark Scanlon (born 1955) is an Australian surfer known for pioneering surfing in the Maldives along with fellow Australian Tony Hussein Hinde.

== Shipwreck in the Maldives ==
In 1973 Scanlon and Tony Hussein Hinde were shipwrecked on the Helengeli Reef in Kaafu Atoll located in the Maldives aboard the Whitewings, a ketch in which they had been hired as crewmembers. The Whitewings had been en route across the Indian Ocean from Sri Lanka to Réunion Island when they were beached on a coral reef in the Helengeli Reef. The pair spent several unplanned months in the Maldives repairing the boat. However, he quickly discovered how good the surfing potential was in the northern Maldives and decided to stay in the country.

== Arrest ==
In 2000, Scanlon was arrested in the Maldives for possession of cannabis. His wife, Mandy Andrews, moved to Maldives to support him. Andrews advocated for Scanlon's release by creating a letter and having people sign it to send to the Maldivian government. Along with his wife, he was visited by Neil Carlyle from the Australian High Commission in Sri Lanka. He was released in 2002 after diplomatic intervention by then-Australian Prime Minister John Howard. After his release, he flew back to Australia where he reunited with his wife in Sydney Airport.

== Personal life ==
Scanlon was born in 1955 and is from Maroubra, Sydney. Scanlon and his wife, Mandy Andrews, currently resides in Sydney.
