= Bellyboarding =

Surface water sport

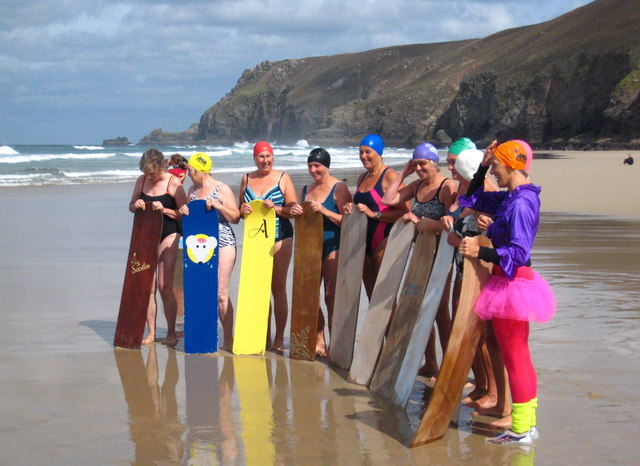
Bellyboarders in UK Cornwall

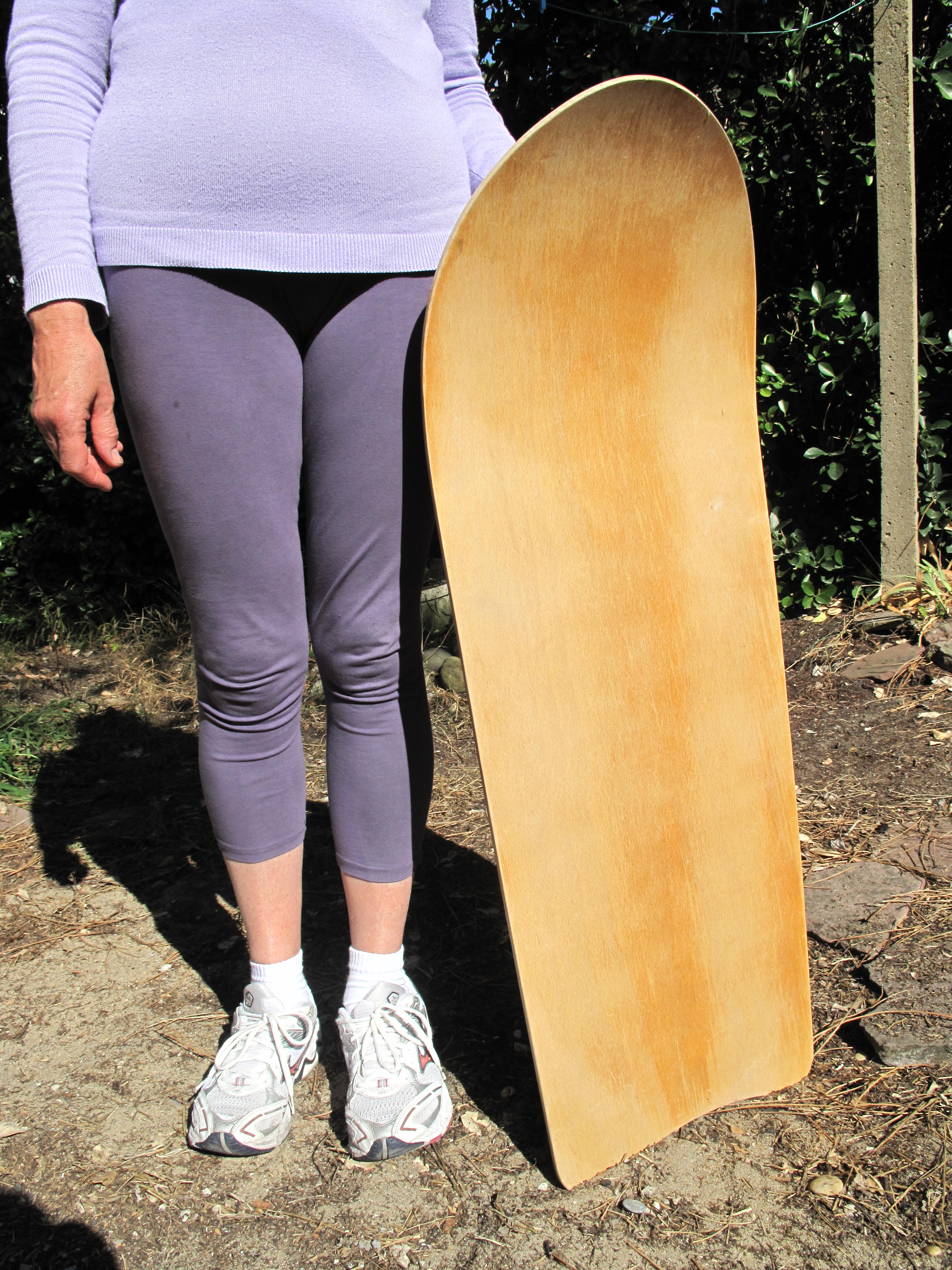
Bellyboard from France in the 1970s

Bellyboarding is a surface water sport in which the surfer rides a bodyboard on the crest, face, and curl of a wave which is carrying the surfer towards the shore.

== History ==
Bellyboarding is the oldest form of surfing from ancient Hawaii & the Polynesian islands. The board design was based on the ancient Hawaiian Paipo boards (Paipo meaning short or small board). In Hawaii people learnt the art of riding prone on these short wooden boards before they attempted to stand up on the longer "alaia" boards.

The boards were made of Gaboon wood or of Paulownia wood.

It appeared in the United Kingdom in the very early 1900s, especially in Cornwall and Devon on the English Channel. It was introduced to the United Kingdom by pioneering Perranporth watermen George Tamblyn and William Saunders, soldiers of WWI in 1918, having been inspired by stories from South African & Commonwealth soldiers they had met and swapped stories with in the trenches.

Tom Tremewan, a relation of George Tamblyn, and the local undertaker, came up with the first bellyboard or surfboard in the UK, made out of coffin lids. These men became the first bellyboard riders of the UK, also known as coffin board or lid surfing.

Bellyboarding bloomed again after WWII (1945) as British soldiers returned home. And wealthy British people who travelled to Hawai and learned surf and later in the 1950s and 60s.

It decreased with the development of bodyboard on polystyrene boards and of actual surfing.

The World Bellyboard Championships, held each year at Chapel Porth in Cornwall, try to revive this sport. The first session took place in 2002 with 20 competitors. Some years later, there were more than 150 competitors also from Australia, USA and the British Virgin Islands.

== Materials ==
Generally, the board used in bellyboarding is a thin board of plywood. The nose of the board is up curved up. There are no swin fins. There is no leash because the board is easier to manage and to keep in hand.

Wetsuits are not necessary because the skin is not irritated by the wood, as polystyrene of bodyboards do.

== See also ==
- Bodyboarding
