= Kneeboarding (surfsport) =

Discipline of surfing

Kneeboarding is a discipline of surfing where the rider paddles on their belly into a wave on a kneeboard, then rides the wave face typically on both knees. The typical kneeboard is between 150 and 200 cm (5 and 6 1/2 ft) in length, with a wide round nose and constructed of Glassfibre over a polyurethane foam core. Kneeboard designers however are known for their wild experimental excess and so most modern materials including various aerospace elements such as Titanium alloys (for fins), carbon fibre and kevlar in epoxy matrices are not unusual. Modern kneeboards may have a rubber pad for the rider's knees, preventing undue wear of the knees, also preventing slipping to help the rider maintain control. Kneeboarders also typically use swimfins and an ankle surfleash.

Kneeboarding popularity increased markedly with the release of the surf movie "Crystal Voyager" by the most prominent of kneeboard riders, Californian, George Greenough. The music of Pink Floyd's "Meddle" combined with spectacular slow-motion images by Mr. Greenough, filming inside the tube whilst surfing a "spoon" kneeboard, changed surfing's direction, influenced board and fin design and earned him a Palme d'Or for short film at the Cannes film festival in the late 1960s.

The advantage of kneeboarding is the ability it gives the rider to deal with tube rides that might require too quick of a take off for a standup surfer or bodyboarder to get into and might get too tight or steep for a stand-up board surfer to deal with. Being closer to the Face of the wave, the feeling of speed is more enhanced, with a resulting increase in excitement. It seems that kneeboarding is where the best of the skill sets unique to each of the surfing disciplines "comes together".
