= John J. Francis (musician) =

- Born: John Francis McGregor (legally changed to John James Francis); 1944; Murwillumbah, NSW. Australia
- Died: 2022 (aged 77–78) Cowra, NSW. Australia

John J. Francis (1944–2022) was an Australian musician, producer and songwriter. His 1974 single, "Play Mumma, Sing Me A Song", reached #22 on the Australian singles chart.

Francis began his career in Newcastle. His first release was with the band The Sorrows. They released the single "Someday"/"I'm Lonely" in 1964 through Big Sound. Next came The John Francis Collexion in 1967 with "I Talk to the Trees"/"You Tell Me" through RCA. This was followed by Magic releasing "I Want to Fly"/"Booked On A Drunk Charge" (1969) and "The Carpenters Song"/"Vintage Wine" (1970) through Phillips.

Going solo in the 70s he released multiple solo albums through Warner Bros, Rock N' Roll Refugee in 1972, Breaks, Works And Thoughts in 1973, Open Fist in 1974 and Wassa Matta in 1975, along with a series of singles and an EP. During this time his song "Simple Ben" was included on the Morning of the Earth soundtrack.

Michael Symons of The Sydney Morning Herald said of Rock N' Roll Refugee "Francis seems to present himself as some kind of dreamer who opens side one with a galactic tour and then side two with a geographic venture." The Sydney Morning Herald's Gil Wahlquist said Francis had an excellent voice and called Breaks, Works And Thoughts "an album to listen to right through." In the same masthead he said for Open Fist Francis changed from an "open-eyed country boy approach" to "bustling bluesy rock" and says "This is a thoughtful exercise which says something about the current musical condition." Commenting on Open Fist Garry Raffaele of The Canberra Times says Francis is "folk-oriented but not folk dominated" and "he sings directly, broken by a hack saw-edge roughness that is his humanity."

2010 saw the release of a compilation album titled Legacy, composed of tracks from his four albums. Noel Mengel of the Courier Mail gave it four stars and says "this long-overdue collection shines a light on that work." Anthony O'Grady of The Australian gave it 3 1/2 stars writing the collection "makes clear that he was a multi-dimensional if contrary talent."

In 2013 Francis's album Absolutely Imperfect was released through Two Faced records. Noel Mengel of the Courier Mail gave it 3 1/2 stars noting Francis had moved on from "folkie" and was leading a "cranked-up rock'n'roll band". Anthony O'Grady of The Australian gave it 4 1/2 writing "Francis's LOUD elevates the sensibility of many of the songs on Absolutely Imperfect to the core of their content: the guitar-gnashing, feedback-splattered Electric Train and the whispering menace of The Bogeyman is Coming."

Other projects included Brute Force And His Drum (with Jim Yonge) who released "Weird And Wonderful"/"Strange" (Copperfield, 1974) and later the EP The Weird & Wonderful World Of Brute Force And His Drum.

== Discography ==
=== Albums ===
Title	Details
Rock N' Roll Refugee	Released: 1972; Label: Warner Bros.
Breaks, Works And Thoughts	Released: 1973; Label: Warner Bros.
Open Fist	Released: 1974; Label: Warner Bros.
Wassa Matta	Released: 1975; Label: Warner Bros.
Absolutely Imperfect	Released: 2013; Label: Two Faced
Legacy (compilation)	Released: 2010; Label: Two Faced

=== EPs ===
Title	Details
Play Mumma	Released: 1974; Label: Warner Bros.

=== Singles ===
List of singles, with Australian chart positions
Year	Title	Peak chart positions	Album
Year	Title	AUS	Album
1972	"Train, Train, Train"/"Pity Me"		Rock N' Roll Refugee
1973	"Play Mumma, Sing Me A Song"/"What To Do"	22	Breaks, Works And Thoughts
1973	"Simple Ben"/"Embarrassing Situation"		Breaks, Works And Thoughts
1973	"City Lights, Saturday Night - 1959"/"Liberated Roadside Lady"		Open Fist
1974	"Lucky Star"/"Money Honey"		Wassa Matta
