= Crystal Voyager =

- Original theatrical poster
- Directed by: David Elfick
- Written by: George Greenough
- Produced by: David Elfick
- Starring: George Greenough; Richie West; Nat Young
- Narrated by: George Greenough
- Cinematography: George Greenough
- Music by: G. Wayne Thomas; Pink Floyd; }
- Release date: 5 December 1973
- Running time: 78 minutes
- Country: Australia
- Language: English

Crystal Voyager is a 1973 Australian surf film directed by David Elfick. It was filmed by Albert Falzon, written and narrated by surfer, photographer and filmmaker George Greenough, who had previously made the 1970 surfing film The Innermost Limits of Pure Fun. The soundtrack was written and produced and performed by G. Wayne Thomas and the "Crystal Voyager Band".

The film is structured as a loose biography of Greenough and was shot largely in California. It documents Greenough's search for uncrowded waves, which led to the construction of his 37-foot ocean-going yacht. It also feature Greenough's surfing friends, Californian Richie West and Australian world champion Nat Young.

Crystal Voyager premiered at the Sydney Opera House on 5 December 1973 and had a successful three-week run there before opening in other states. The theatrical 35 mm version of the film is different from the original 16 mm release and was re-edited by Elfick and Greenough. It became one of Australia's most successful surf films, grossing more than A$100,000 (in 1973) on its initial Australian release, before being picked up by British Hemdale Corporation. Crystal Voyager gained substantial press on its release, mostly due to its strong reception at the Cannes Film Festival. It had a record-breaking six-month run in London's West End, where it played a double bill with René Laloux's animated science-fiction film Fantastic Planet, grossing more than £100,000.

The closing sequence, Greenough's short film Echoes, is generally considered to be the highlight of the film. Filmed with a camera in a waterproof housing strapped to Greenough's back, weighing 17 pounds (7.7 kg) in all, the sequence is composed entirely of slow-motion footage shot inside the curl of waves, edited to the 23-minute song "Echoes" by Pink Floyd. The group allowed Elfick and Greenough to use the music in their film in exchange for the use of Greenough's footage as a visual background when they performed "Echoes" in concert.

A high-resolution restoration of the Echoes sequence is set to be posted to Pink Floyd's YouTube channel on 17 October 2026.
