= David Elfick =

Australian film director

- Born: 20 December 1944 (age 81); Sydney, New South Wales, Australia
- Occupations: Television and film screenwriter; director; producer; actor
- Years active: 1969–present

David Elfick (born 20 December 1944) is an Australian film and television writer, director, producer and occasional actor. He is known for his association with writer-director Phillip Noyce, with whom he has collaborated on films including Newsfront (1978) and Rabbit-Proof Fence (2002).

== Career ==
Elfick began his film career as the producer of the 1971 surf movie Morning of the Earth, directed by Alby Falzon. In 1973 Elfick collaborated with surfer, writer and cinematographer George Greenough as producer-director of Crystal Voyager. This became one of the most successful Australian surf movies ever made, grossing over A$100,000 on its first release, followed by six-month run in London, where it ran on a double bill with René Laloux's Fantastic Planet and grossed over UK£100,000.

Elfick was co-writer (with Philippe Mora) of the original story for the acclaimed docu-drama Newsfront, in which he also had a small role, and he also had a minor role (as a projectionist) in Albie Thoms' Palm Beach (1979). In addition to writing, Elfick has also worked as a director, making his directorial debut in 1969. Directing credits include Crystal Voyager (1973), Love in Limbo (1993), and No Worries (1994).

Elfick's credits as a producer include the pop film Starstruck (1982), Undercover (1983), the comedy Emoh Ruo (1985), the drama Blackrock (1997) and the multi-award-winning Rabbit Proof Fence (2002). He also produced Around the World in 80 Ways (released in 1988), which was directed by his friend Stephen MacLean.

== Filmography ==
=== Directing ===
| Year | Title | Notes |
|---|---|---|
| 1969 | Magnificent Males | |
| 1973 | Crystal Voyager | |
| 1975 | Surfabout 75 | |
| 1976 | The Levi Strauss Story | |
| 1988 | Fields of Fire II | Miniseries |
| 1990 | Harbour Beat | |
| 1993 | Love in Limbo | |
| 1994 | No Worries | |
| 1998 | Never Tell Me Never | Television film |
| 2002 | Gliding with George | |
| 2003 | Combat Women | Documentary |

=== Acting credits ===
| Year | Title | Role | Notes |
|---|---|---|---|
| 1975 | The Golden Cage | Man at Party | |
| 1978 | Newsfront | Rocker | |
| 1980 | Palm Beach | Projectionist | |
| 1985 | Emoh Ruo | Suitor | |
