= Scott Dillon =

Australian surfer (1928–2018)

Scott Brewster Dillon (19 August 1928 – 12 December 2018) was an Australian surfer.

In 2004, he was inducted into the Surfing Hall of Fame as one of the original six legends of the Australian surfing industry.

Dillon owned a former surf and shark museum near Coffs Harbour, New South Wales, called Legends Surf Museum, which was forced to close in 2011 when major highway reconstruction began.

== Early life ==
Dillon's father, Joseph Dillon was Secretary-Treasurer of Bondi Surf Life Saving Club. At age 15 Dillon became a lifesaver with the club, having spent every weekend at the beach with his parents and siblings Helen Dillon and Josephine Dillon. His sister Helen went on to become a famous swimmer and competed in many triathlons, she was also featured in the swimming hall of fame. Scott rode and paddled a 16-foot-long hollow, timber surf ski then called a 'toothpick' in the era before Malibu solid balsa surf boards. At age 24 he departed for a ten-year overseas working holiday, lumber-jacking in Canada and Alaska and professional boxing televised in Canada and the northern US.

== Bantam weight boxing career ==
Dillon began boxing at Bondi Surf Bathers' Life Saving Club boxing events. He was Australian Amateur Bantam Weight Champion 1952, at age 24. He won the main title for three consecutive years, and narrowly missed competing in the 1956 Olympic Games in Melbourne. He continued boxing in Canada and the northern US on TV for five years.

== Free diving and spear fishing ==
He began free diving and spear fishing at Bondi in 1946 during the very early era of the sport, with Don Linklater, Andy Amstrong, Spud Murphy, Jack Murray and Vic Ley Sr before the foundation of the Underwater Spear Fisherman's Association (in 1952). He later went professional spearfishing in Ceylon for 12 months.

== Race car driver ==
He drove midgets and sedans at Sydney Show ground and speedways around Australia for eight years, winning many major events including three NSW titles. He was an A-grade dirt midget speed car champion in New South Wales in 1956 He was sponsored by TV actor Ty Hardin who was working in Australia on a series.

== Surfboard manufacturing ==
He began the company Scott Dillon Surfboards at Brookvale making longboards in 1961. Other manufacturers starting at that time were Gordon Woods, Barry Bennett, Bill Wallace and Keyo. The first boards were solid Malibu-style, made of balsa wood which preceded foam boards. He continued this until 1967, then went to Coffs Harbour and later established the Legends Surf Museum.

== Hawaii surf trips ==
Dillon has attended major surf riding events in Hawaii, France and UK since his first visit to Hawaii in 1963. He has visited Hawaii every year since 1963. He represented Australia at each Oahu surf championship from 1963 to 1975. He was the first to surf Bare Island Bombora (Botany Bay, Sydney), with an estimated wave height of 10 meters, in 1952.

== Appearances in surf movies ==
His appearances are numerous and include all Australian made (longboard) movies beginning in 1961.

== Death ==
Dillon died on 12 December 2018 aged 90.
