= Angourie, New South Wales =

Angourie
- Town
- Angourie pumping

- Coordinates: 29°28′45″S 153°21′34″E
- Country: Australia
- State: New South Wales
- LGA: Clarence Valley

Government
  - State electorate: Clarence
  - Federal division: Page

Population
  - Total: 192 (2021 census)
- Postcode: 2464

Angourie is a coastal village in the Clarence Valley Council of New South Wales, Australia. Angourie is located 5 km south of Yamba, New South Wales, and is at the northern tip of Yuraygir National Park. Towns that surround Angourie are Yamba and Wooloweyah.

== In popular culture ==
Angourie was featured in the 1971 surfing film Morning of the Earth. Most of the country scenes were photographed around Angourie and on the New South Wales North Coast mainly from Crescent Head, New South Wales to Cape Byron area.

== Attractions ==
Spookies

Angourie Beach was declared a National Surfing Reserve in 2007, the second site in Australia to be recognised for its significance to recreational surfing and is often visited by the world's best surfers. Also of interest, Angourie Point is world renowned for the quality of its waves for surfing. Angourie beach is also known for Spookies which are short, very hollow right point breaks that occur just to the north.

A local attraction of note is the Angourie Pools; a group of blue and green freshwater pools created when the old quarries hit underground springs. The story goes that the miners working on the quarries went home one night and came back the next morning to find the quarries filled with water. The pools are less than 20 metres from the ocean, and the two bodies of water are separated by mounds of quarried rock and earth. The pools are deep, approximately 15–20 metres, and are a very popular swimming spot.

Yuraygir National Park, adjacent to Angourie, is considered to have one of the most spectacular coastal walks in the state.

== Gallery ==
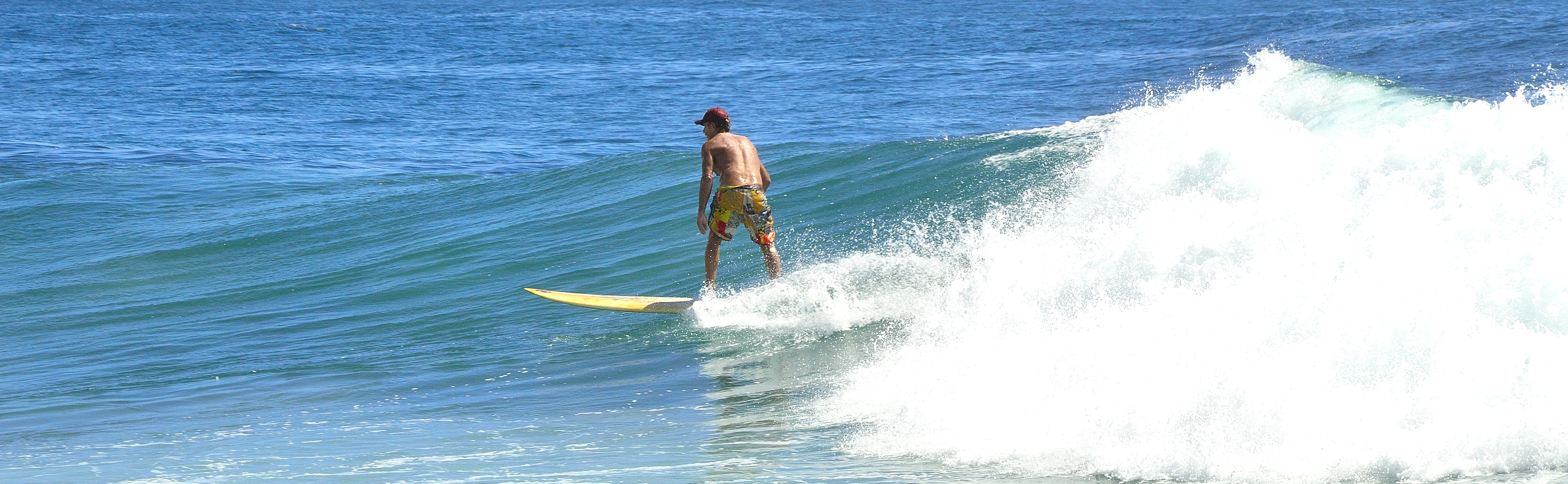
Surfer at Angourie

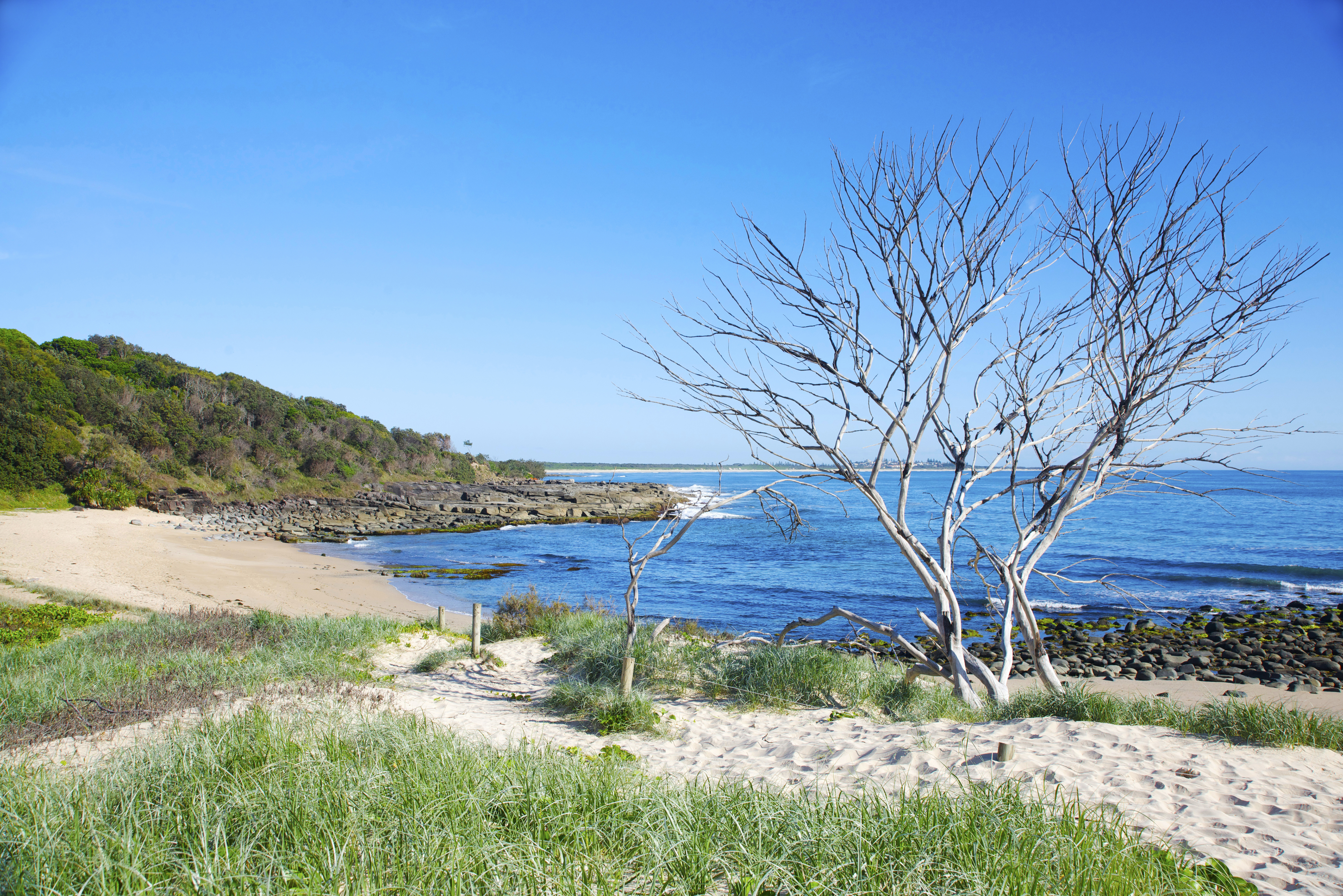
Angourie beach, Australia

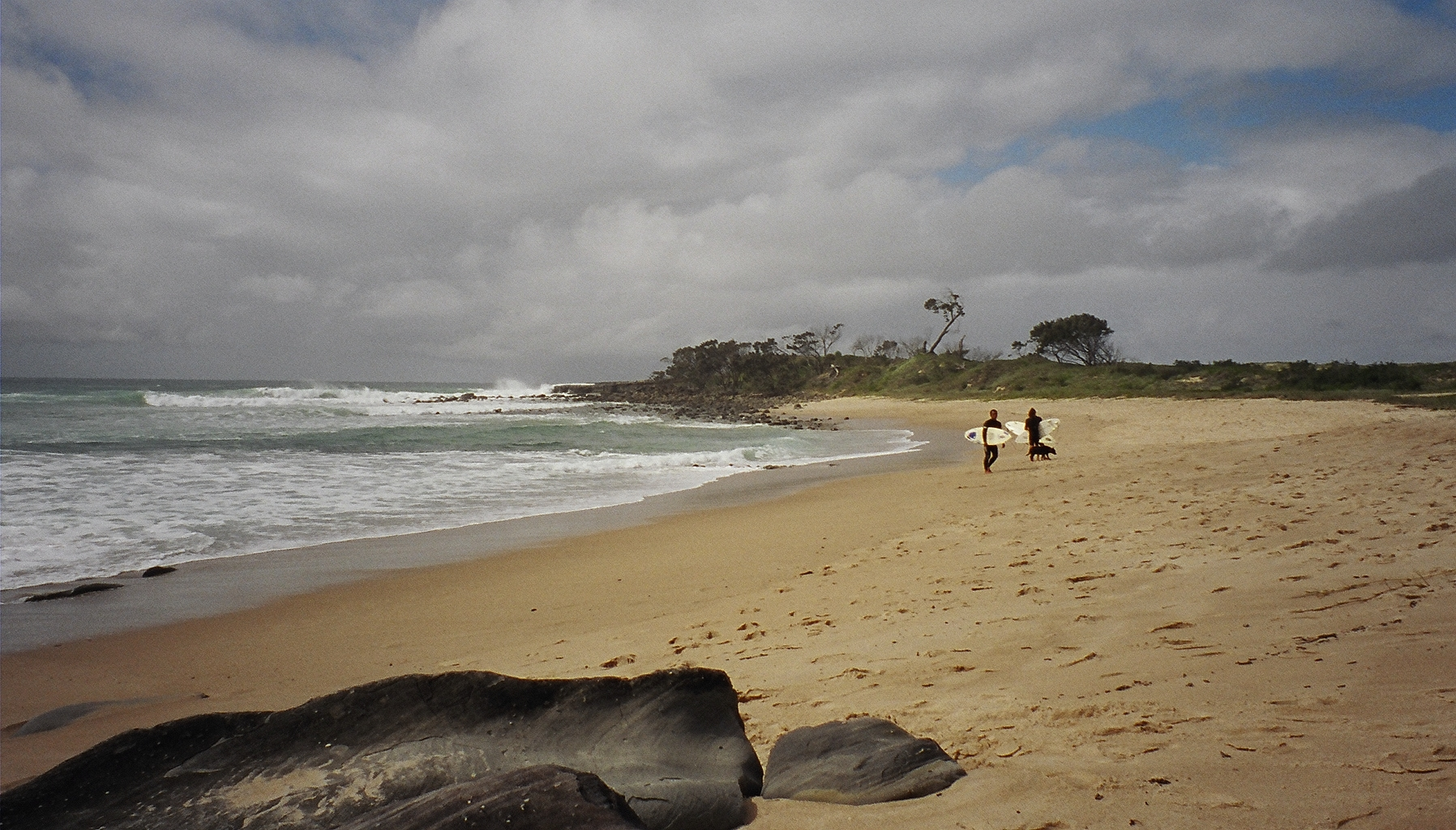
Surfers at Angourie Point on a cloudy day

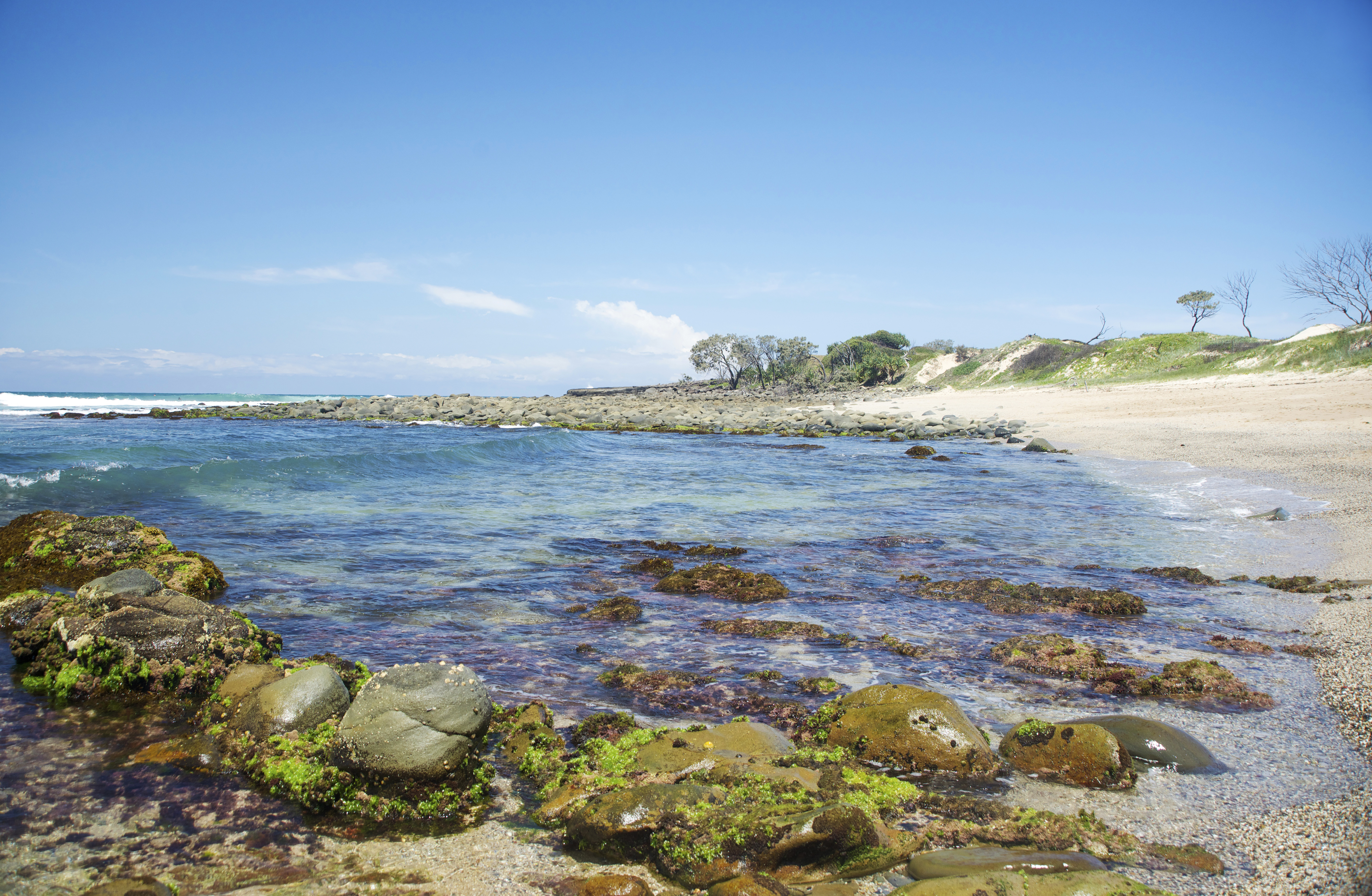
Angourie Beach, Australia
