= George Greenough =

American surfer (born 1941)

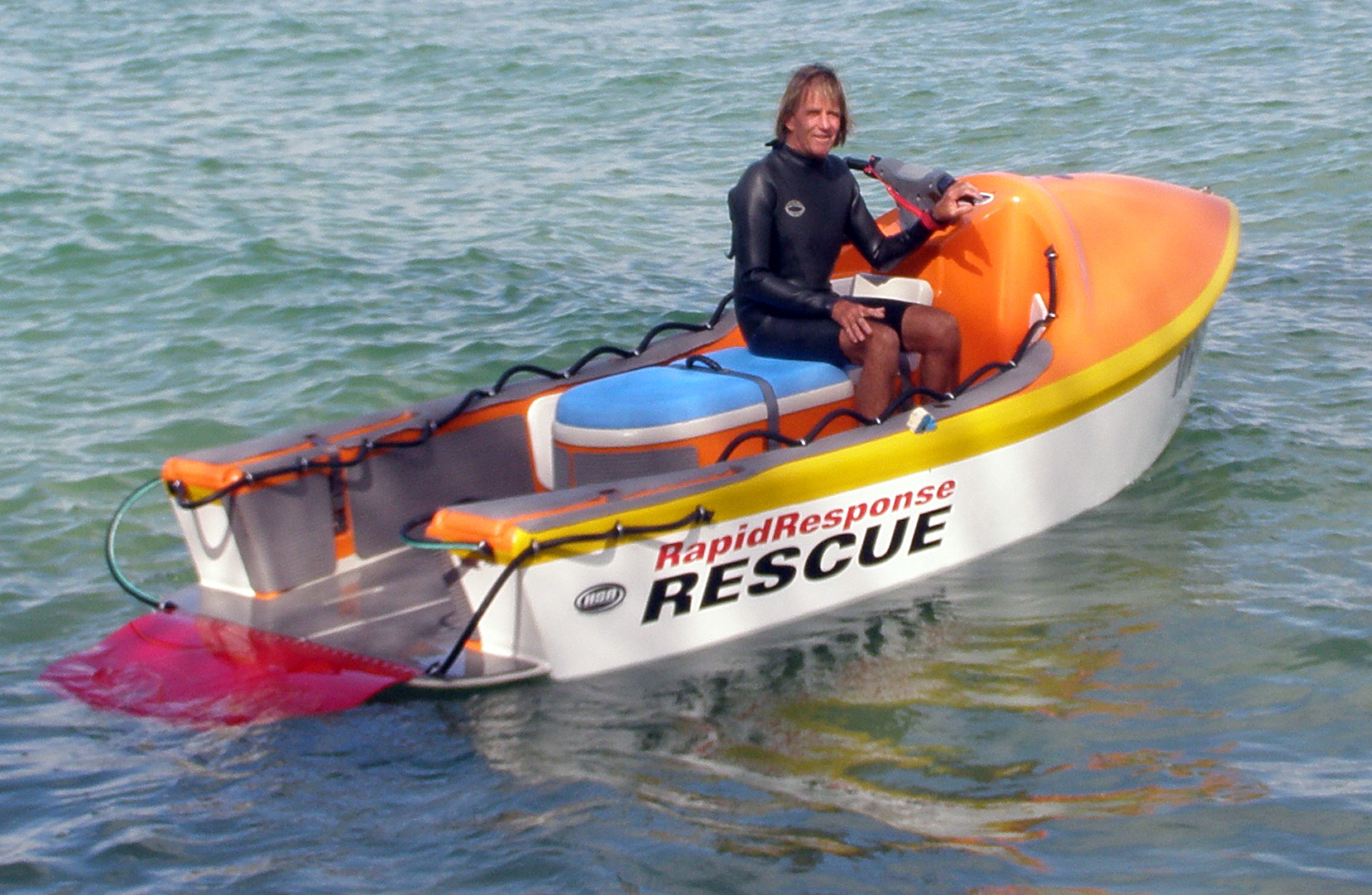
Greenough on a rescue craft in 2008

George Hamilton Perkins Greenough (born November 6, 1941) is an influential surfer, known during the 1960s and 1970s for his work in film, and in surfboard design, fin characteristics, and other creations for the aquatic medium. The contributions of Greenough, along with Bob McTavish, to the development of short boards resulted in a number advances in surfboard shaping and other surfing technology.

== Personal life ==
George Greenough was born in Santa Barbara, California, to Hamilton Perkins Greenough and Helen Marie Greenough, née Jensen. George’s father, Hamilton Perkins Greenough, spent part of his career as a shipwright, building wooden picket boats for the U.S. Navy during World War II. Contrary to what many people have written, George Greenough is not a direct descendant of the famous American sculptor, Horatio Greenough, but they are half second cousins four times removed.

George underwent open-heart surgery at age ten and became known as an unconventional "character", "... a thin-faced, narrow-shouldered scion ... always shoeless, often shirt-less, resin-stained Levis clamped onto his nonexistent hips with a length of rope, stringy blonde hair cut straight across at eyebrow level and flapping down over his ears." Greenough was not known to surf at crowded surf breaks, but preferred the solitude of northern Hollister Ranch or surfing Rincon at dusk to avoid the crowds. In 1964, Greenough went to Australia and travelled back and forth between Santa Barbara and his new home for some time. He now resides in Byron Bay, in New South Wales, Australia.

== Surfing influence ==
Greenough is credited with the design of the modern surfboard fin, as well as influencing modern surfing's more radical maneuvers. The newer short boards were built specifically to copy the same style of banking turns and fast-down-the line attitude that Greenough was known for. Greenough started to shape his first boards out of balsa wood in his high school wood shop. He started as a stand-up surfer in the 1950s, but then began switching between kneeboarding and an air-inflated mattress in 1961. According to Greenough, they gave him a heightened sense of speed that came from a lowered body position. The famous "spoon"' board was created in 1961, "a blunt-nosed balsa kneeboard, 5 feet long and 23 inches wide, with a dished-out midsection and tail that slimmed down to a mere half-inch thickness". He replaced the normal surfboard fin of the day, a massive 10-inch (250 mm) protrusion, with a smaller (almost by a third) flexible swept-back model he had copied from the shape of the rear dorsal fin of a tuna. That design had the effect of reducing drag and increasing the handling capabilities of the board. The new fin, which Greenough called a "high aspect ratio fin", was an elegantly functional piece of equipment, but took around three years to become popular.

In 1964, Greenough traveled to Australia, where he showed the local surfers his wave riding style of sharp bottom turns and deep barrel rides. He influenced Nat Young, who used Greenough's fin design and won the 1966 world surfing championships in San Diego, California, ushering in an era of surfing history during which Australians emerged as a dominant force. Young described Greenough as "The greatest surfer in the world today," After this first visit to Australia, Greenough shaped a board which he explained as the next step in the progression of surfing, "a fish moves when he swims… so why not make a whole board that moves when it's on a wave?" The board he created had multiple layers of fiberglass shaped like the old balsa kneeboards he rode, a glued on ridge of polyurethane foam on top of the deck near the rails and nose, with the back end of the board made entirely of fiberglass. The final piece of the board was his signature "flex-fin". The board was so small and light that it was not very suitable for small surf. Only in big surf did the board reveal its performance abilities and allow Greenough to maneuver on waves with more power and speed than with previous designs: "Greenough was riding like a visitor from ten years in surfing's future. He cranked out bottom turns where his board tilted up almost 90 degrees…" In 1966, he made his second board, which he nicknamed the "velo", from "velocity".

== Movies ==
Greenough has made multiple films in his career; he would swim out into the surf with fins and take pictures looking out from the inside of the barrel. This "barrel-vision" was regarded as a major progression in surf photography. His film, The Innermost Limits of Pure Fun, was shot using a massive 28 pound camera with a water-proof housing strapped onto his shoulder which he used to show the inside of a wave. His film was considered so inspiring by surfers that entire audiences of them would yell and shout for the duration of the movie. The film caught the attention of a new band called Pink Floyd who donated music for the loosely biographical following film, Crystal Voyager, which Greenough wrote and narrated; Pink Floyd also used the film as a backdrop for their concerts.

Coca-Cola used some of Greenough's videos of wave barrels in a television advertisement in 1975. Part of Crystal Voyager was shot at ten times normal speed, creating a continuous flow of intensely detailed images of water droplets hitting the lens, all moving in dance-like synchronization with the motion of the wave. Greenough has worked in recent decades on Dolphin Glide, an experimental underwater photo series which captures images of dolphins riding waves, using a special ski he invented. Greenough is also featured in an early scene in Bruce Brown's surf film The Endless Summer.

== Boats ==
While tinkering with surfboard designs, Greenough also experimented in boat hull design. While living in California he redeveloped the American Boston Whaler hull to suit his particular needs, which included capsize resistance and open ocean mishandling flaws such as pearling and broaching. He designed a modified cathedral type hull and has used this design to build a number of beach-launchable and offshore fishing boats for himself for use both in America and Australia. He built a 15 foot version in Australia which he rigged with a camera boom for filming his movie Dolphin Glide. His hull design is an exceptionally good performer in the rugged surf experienced on the Australian coastline, and it allowed him to follow and film pods of Dolphins through the breaking surf without fear of mishap. His next development was an expanded jet-ski type watercraft which was intended as a Rescue Craft in the hopes the Surf Life Savers New South Wales (SLSNSW) would pick it up as a replacement for their current fleet of jet skis, but little interest was shown by the SLSNSW. He has since used this boat primarily for fishing the reefs offshore Eastern Australia. This ocean craft design, known as the GARC (Greenough Advanced Rescue Craft), was a product he developed to perform rescue missions in the breaking surfline and on the open ocean. The GARC is currently manufactured by MAPC (Maritime Applied Physics Corporation), which holds the patents for the craft. This jet-ski look-alike is a more rugged and stable version that can be launched in the waves or by an aircraft. The development of the open transom and the stern tongue make it possible for rescues without having to actually lift the person in trouble out of the water. The GARC holds four people and will be used by the United States Navy, Coast Guard, and National Guard.

== Bibliography ==
- Greenough, H. P. (1969) Some descendants of Captain William Greenough of Boston, Massachusetts, and notes on related families; Also some descendants of Robert Greenough of Rowley, and Thomas Greenough of Nova Scotia. Privately Printed.
- Warshaw, M. (2010). The History of Surfing Book (pp. 239–242). Chronicle Books.
- Westwick, P., Neushul P. (2013). The World in the Curl: An Unconventional History of Surfing Book (pp. 137–138). Crown.
- Boyd, D., Divine, J., Pezman, S.(2014). Legends of Surfing: The Greatest Surfriders from Duke Kahanamoku to Kelly Slater (pp. 49–50). MVP Books.
- Edwards, A., Skinner, J., Gilbert, K. (2003). Some Like it Hot: The Beach as a Cultural Dimension Book. (Sport, Culture & Society ed., Vol. 3, pp. 139–140). Meyer & Meyer Verlag.
