= Albert Falzon =

Australian film director

Albert "Albe" Falzon is an Australian filmmaker, photographer, and publisher in the surfing sub-culture.

== Early life ==
Albert Falzon, known as "Albe", grew up in the beachside suburb of Maroubra in Sydney, Australia. He did not begin surfing until the age of 14, when the Falzon family moved to the New South Wales Central Coast.

== Filmmaking ==
Falzon has always appreciated the power of music in his films and directed Morning of the Earth (1972), an influential surf film. The film portrays surfers living in spiritual harmony with nature, making their own boards and homes as they travel in search of the perfect wave across Australia's north-east coast, Bali and Hawaii. Falzon's inaugural feature film was the first Australian film to receive a "gold record" for soundtrack album sales.

A passion for travel, particularly to remote and spectacular regions of the world, has been a major influence on the themes of Falzon's work. A six-part documentary series focused on traditional festivals in Far Eastern countries, such as Sri Lanka, India, Burma, Ladakh and Tibet, and has been sold in over eighty countries worldwide. And not all locations were easily accessible. The journey through Tibet to the mystical mountain of Kailas was an arduous two weeks in sub zero temperatures, there the film crew recorded for the very first time the sacred Wesak Festival.

In 1982, Falzon directed "Khumba Mela (same as it ever was)", a 90-minute piece filmed in the waterways of Kashmir in India about a Saddhu's pilgrimage. He approached Brian Eno in London about using some of his music as part of the soundtrack. After viewing the film Eno commented that he'd "never seen a film that was more suited as a vehicle for his work". Brian Eno and Harold Budd are both in the soundtrack, along with music from Pink Floyd and Talking Heads. He entered this film into the Cannes Film Festival with the title "Crystal Voyager".

The Road to Timbuktu follows a path from Casablanca across the Sahara Desert to Timbuktu.

Falzon's twelve-part series Festivals of the World has sold to over 80 countries. He has also directed two long version music videos for Chris Blackwell, founder of Island Records, and was DOP on "Women of Spirit" a one-hour television program filmed in India, NY and London. He has written a series of children's programs and has completed a screenplay for a feature film, tentatively titled The Dreamtime.

He filmed two surfing programs and co-produced a one-hour program on Nicholas Roerich, a Russian artist.

GLOBUS—The Meaning of Light is a film collaboration with Jeff Hornbaker.

Falzon or his work appears in Jolyon Hoff's 2023 surfing documentary You Should Have Been Here Yesterday.

== Photography and publishing ==
Falzon's career in filmmaking was a natural progression from international still photography, and later combined with magazine publishing, in Australia, Israel and the island of Bali in Indonesia. In 1970, he was co-founder and publisher of the surfing newspaper Tracks, with David Elfick and John Witzig.
