= Australia's Surfing Life =

Australian magazine

Australia's Surfing Life Magazine cover featuring Brenden "Margo" Margieson, July 1998.

Surfing Life, formerly Australia’s Surfing Life, is a magazine about surfing published at the Gold Coast, Queensland, Australia.

It was founded in 1985 by Peter Morrison In 2016 it was purchased by Morrison Media publisher and General Manager Craig Sims (former owner of Atoll Media, publisher of Zigzag), and his Morrison Media colleagues Graeme Murdoch and Rob Bain. In 2018 Craig Sims went on the hunt for a succession as he desired to reduce his load, he found Ray Bisschop (former creative director) who he believed would be able to drive the publication forward. The first issue of Surfing Life appeared in August 1985.
