= David Miller (Australian musician) =

David G. Miller AM
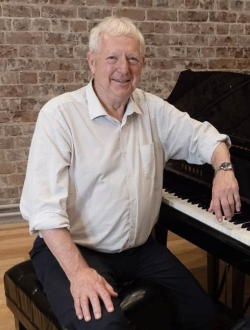
- David G. Miller, collaborative pianist, collaborative performance trainer, instrumental and vocal coach

Background information
- Birth name: David Graham Miller
- Born: 1943; Nyah West, Victoria, Australia
- Genres: Collaborative piano

David Graham Miller AM is an Australian collaborative pianist. Along with Geoffrey Collins he was nominated for the 1990 ARIA Award for Best Classical Album for their album Flute Australia Volume 2 (2MBS-FM). He performed on the first full recording of Boojum by Peter and Martin Wesley-Smith with Sydney Philharmonia motet choir. With baritone Michael Halliwell, Miller released Soldier, Soldier: The Barrack-Room Ballads Of Rudyard Kipling (ArtWorks, 2001). In 2013, Miller recorded Echo: the songs of Horace Keats for ABC Classics with soprano Wendy Dixon, baritone John Pringle and violinist Marina Marsden, performing the songs of the Australian composer Horace Keats. He continues to regularly record for Wirripang Records and perform with Charisma and Grevillea ensembles.

David G. Miller was appointed Member of the Order of Australia in 1995 for "service to music, particularly as a piano accompanist".

== Disocography ==
=== Albums ===
List of albums, with selected details
Title	Details
Flute Australia (with Geoffrey Collins)	Released: 1983; Format: LP; Label: MBS Records (MBS6)
Flute Australia Volume 2 (with Geoffrey Collins)	Released: 1988; Format: LP, CD, Cassette; Label: MBS Records (MBS 13CD)
Where No Shadows Fall (with Robert Allworth)	Released: 1988; Format: LP, CD, Cassette; Label: Jade Records (JAD LP1004)
Liszt Songs (with Lauris Elms)	Released: 1989; Format: LP, CD, Cassette; Label: MBS Records (MBS 17)
Back From Oblivion (with Nick Byrne)	Released: 2008; Format: CD; Label: Melba Recordings (MR 301111)
Boojum! - nonsense, truth and Lewis Carroll: a musical by Martin Wesley-Smith and Peter Wesley-Smith (with Sydney Philharmonia Motet Choir, John Grundy (conductor), Michael Askill (percussion) and guest soloists)	Published by Vox Australis [VAST 010-2] — 2 CDs (112 min.); Recorded in Studio A, EMI, Sydney, 1991.
Soldier, Soldier The Barrack-Room Ballads Of Rudyard Kipling (with Michael Halliwell)	Label: Artworks – AW028; Released: 2001
Echo: the songs of Horace Keats with Wendy Dixon (soprano), John Pringle (baritone) and Marina Marsden (violin)	Label: ABC Music; Released: 2002

== Awards and nominations ==
=== ARIA Music Awards ===
The ARIA Music Awards is an annual awards ceremony that recognises excellence, innovation, and achievement across all genres of Australian music. They commenced in 1987.

Year	Nominee / work	Award	Result	Ref.
1990	Flute Australia Volume 2 (with Geoffrey Collins)	Best Classical Album	Nominated	
