= Leunig =

Leunig is a surname. Notable people with the surname include:

- Mary Leunig (born 1950), Australian visual artist
- Michael Leunig (1945–2024), Australian cartoonist, poet, and artist
- Tim Leunig (born 1971), British economist
