= Gyan Evans =

Australian singer-songwriter and record producer

Gyan
- Born: ca. 1960; Geelong, Victoria, Australia
- Origin: Sydney
- Genres: Adult contemporary, folk, pop rock
- Occupation(s): Singer-songwriter, musician, record producer
- Instrument: Vocals
- Years active: 1989–present
- Labels: Trafalgar, Warner Australia, Universal, Museagency

Gyan Evans (born c. 1960), who performs as Gyan (/ɡiːˈɑːn/), is an Australian singer-songwriter and record producer. She began her musical career in the Sydney band Haiku before winning the 1986 grand final in the local version of the TV talent quest Star Search. This led to a recording contract with Warner Music, which resulted in her October 1989 debut self-titled album. It peaked in the top 30 on the ARIA Albums Chart and provided "Wait", which reached the top 20 on the ARIA Singles Chart. At the ARIA Music Awards of 1990 she won the ARIA Award for Best New Talent.

== Early years ==
Gyan Evans was born in about 1960 and was raised in Geelong. Both her parents were English migrants and Gyan is the youngest of their four children. Her older sister Asakti Evans is also a singer. For secondary education Gyan attended Matthew Flinders Girls High School and, at the age of 17, changed her first name to Gyan: "I went to India ... I joined a weird religious cult and I was given that name by an old man with a long beard". By 1989 both her parents were dead.

== Career ==
=== 1989–1991: Debut album and ARIA Award ===
"Wait"
In 1989, Gyan had her breakthrough song on the Australian charts with "Wait". The song contributed to her ARIA Award for Best New Talent.

Gyan signed with the Trafalgar Productions label, which was distributed by Warner Australia. In October 1989 she released her debut self-titled album, which peaked at No. 27 on the ARIA Albums Chart. It was produced by Charles Fisher (1927, The Seekers, Midnight Oil, Hoodoo Gurus, Olivia Newton-John, Radio Birdman). Fisher had been given Gyan's demos by a mutual friend and together they recorded the album at Trafalgar Studios in Annandale. The Canberra Times' Penelope Layland described the album as "patchy but reasonably successful ... [she] has an excellent voice. However, she also has what some of her contemporaries lack and that is a true sense of musical style and an already well-developed song-writing ability".

Ahead of the album in August she released a single, "Wait", which peaked at No. 14 on the ARIA Singles Chart and remained in the top 100 for 22 weeks. It was co-written by Gyan with Geoffrey Stapleton (GANGgajang) and Gary Frost of 1927. A second single, "It's Alright", was written by Gyan. It reached the top 50 in December. A third single, "Black Wedding Ring" was released in February 1990, and peaked at No. 93.

From October 1989 to January the next year, Gyan toured Australia to promote the album backed by The Dearly Beloved with Stapleton on guitar and keyboards, Asakti (Gyan's sister) on backing vocals, Hanuman Das on drums, Mark O'Connor on keyboards and David Sparks on guitar. Later Peter Willersdorf (ex-Tim Gaze Band) replaced Orszaczky on bass guitar. O'Connor had also worked on the album, co-writing tracks with Gyan. At the ARIA Music Awards of 1990 Gyan was awarded the Best New Talent for the previous year's work. In April that year she toured Europe, where she was popular in the Soviet Union despite her "fans not understanding the words of her songs". During this time, she contributed vocals to the Top Ten album The Other Side by 1927.

=== 1992–1997: Reddest Red ===
In 1992, Gyan released her second studio album, Reddest Red, which was again produced by Fisher. New Zealand musician, Dave Dobbyn, supplied guitar and backing vocals. In July 1992, the album's lead single, "Something's Gotta Give", which had been co-written with Gaze, was released, and entered the top 100 in August. A second single, "Visualize" was released in October. A track "Will I with You" from Reddest Red was used on the soundtrack for the Russell Crowe film The Sum of Us (July 1994). Some of her songwriting occurred when staying in "a pretty sleazy hotel – in London and it was good for writing because it was a kind of depressed place. It was interesting because it had this sort of contrast – a city falling down yet an energy with such large amounts of people".

Australian musicologist Ian McFarlane noted that Reddest Red "made less use of the synthesised textures of [her] debut". Jan Borrie of The Canberra Times said it was "more cohesive and well-rounded than the first and marks a more mature style of song writing for the singer". To promote the album Gyan toured with Tim Gaze on acoustic guitar (ex-Tamam Shud, Kahvas Jute, Rose Tattoo). Gyan was not worried by Gaze's previous bands "You can't go by what people have done before. I find that interesting chemistry often works." In 1995 Gyan relocated to London to work.

=== 1998–2004: Suburban Opera ===
In 1998 Gyan travelled to the United States to start work on a third album titled Suburban Opera, with producer Desmond Child. It was not released in its entirety: a promo-only single, "Don't Hide Your Wild Away", was issued in 2001 and in 2003 most of its tracks first appeared as The Invisible Bird via Gyan's website. Meanwhile, she sang backing vocals on Ricky Martin's track "Nobody Wants to Be Lonely" from his album, Sound Loaded. She signed to Universal Records and worked as a songwriter for US country music singer, LeAnn Rimes. Rimes, who covered Gyan's song "Love Is an Army" on her album Twisted Angel, recalled:

Of all the songs I have recorded in my career, this is my favorite. It's so beautiful and emotional that you really have to feel it to sing it; you can't just go through the motions. I think the meaning of this song is open for everyone's interpretation, but for me it's about the fighting she's done for love and how in the end, love conquers all. The song is so natural, so simple. Basically, it's just my voice and strings. This song has some country elements in it, like my yodel at the end, but I wouldn't consider it a country song.

— LeAnn Rimes, RAM Entertainment

=== 2005–2009: Collaboration with Michael Leunig ===
By 2005 Gyan had returned to Australia and lived near Byron Bay. The following year she collaborated with Michael Leunig and released the album Billy the Rabbit which was based on Leunig's poetry. According to Gyan "It came about through a complete labour of love. I set a lot of his poetry to music over the space of a year without really knowing what I was doing. I had no motive, no plan. A friend of mine knew him and I contacted him at The Age and sent it to him, he fell madly in love with it." The album contained a duet with Paul Kelly on the track "The Path to Your Door". Released to glowing reviews, Gyan and Leunig launched the album at the Melbourne Writers Festival where Gyan sang and Leunig accompanied her whilst illustrating. The two artists also performed together at the Byron Bay Writers Festival and performed four shows at the Sydney Opera House in March 2007. The performance won the Sydney Theatre Award for Best Cabaret of 2007. The album of Billy the Rabbit was produced by Gyan and Simon Greaves.

=== 2010–present: Superfragilistically and This Girl's in Love ===
Superfragilistically is Gyan's fifth studio album and was released in 2010. It was runner-up Best Adult-Themed Album of 2010 in The Sydney Morning Herald which previously gave the album a four-star review, calling it "intensely beautiful, emotionally honest, sensitive and seductive". The Brisbane Courier called it a "staggeringly beautiful record". It was Album of the Week on ABC Radio National's Daily Planet program, and featured on ABC Triple J's Sunday Night Safran program.

In 2015, Gyan released This Girl's in Love.

== Other work ==
In 2002, Gyan contributed the song "Life's Great If You Don't Weaken" to the soundtrack of the Australian film The Nugget and co-wrote Paul Kelly's "Nobody She Knows". She also appears on the album Hymn for Her from James Cruickshank of The Cruel Sea.

In 2008, Gyan's children's book, How Weird Is That?, which features illustrations by Michelle Dawson was published. The book was shortlisted for the Crichton Award for Children's Book Illustration by the Children's Book Council of Australia. She also published a collection of poetry entitled Bear in Mind in 2012.

Gyan has also contributed to the soundtracks for the Australian films Weekend with Kate, The Sum of Us, 33 Postcards, Mental, Drift, The Turning, The Little Death and Little Tornadoes.

== Discography ==
=== Albums ===
List of studio albums, with release date and label details shown
Title	Album details	Peak chart positions	Certification
Title	Album details	AUS	Certification
Gyan	Released: 16 October 1989; Label: Trafalgar/ WEA (256870.2); Format: CD, LP	27	ARIA: Gold
Reddest Red	Released: 12 October 1992; Label: Trafalgar/ WEA (450990615.2); Format: CD, Cassette	105	
Suburban Opera	Released: October 2003; Label: The Museagency; Format: CD, DD	–	
Billy the Rabbit (with Michael Leunig)	Released: September 2006; Label: The Museagency (MU004); Format: CD, DD	–	
Superfragilistically	Released: 5 July 2010; Label: The Museagency (MU011); Format: CD, LP, DD	–	
This Girl's in Love	Released: October 2015; Label: The Museagency (MU011); Format: CD, DD, streaming	–	

=== Singles ===
List of singles, with year and details
Title	Year	Peak chart positions	Album
Title	Year	AUS	Album
"Wait"	1989	14	Gyan
"It's Alright"	1989	49	Gyan
"Black Wedding Ring"	1990	93	Gyan
"Something's Gotta Give"	1992	80	Reddest Red
"Visualize"	1992	145	Reddest Red
"Goodnews"	1993	–	Reddest Red
"Don't Hide Your Wild Away"	2001	–	Suburban Opera

== Awards ==
=== ARIA Music Awards ===
The ARIA Music Awards is an annual awards ceremony that recognises excellence, innovation, and achievement across all genres of Australian music. Gyan won one award from four nominations.

Year	Nominee / work	Award	Result
1990	Gyan	Best Female Artist	Nominated
1990	Gyan	Best New Talent	Won
1990	Gyan	Breakthrough Artist – Album	Nominated
1990	"Wait"	Breakthrough Artist – Single	Nominated

== Filmography ==
=== Film ===
Year	Title	Performance	Type
1988	Young Einstein	Cameo role (uncredited)	Feature film

=== Television ===
Year	Title	Performance	Type
1985	Star Search	Herself - Contestant (Winner)	TV series
1986	Late Night with Jono and Dano	Herself	TV series, 1 episode
1989; 1989	Countdown Revolution	Herself sings "Wait"	ABC TV series, 1 episode
1989; 1989	Hey Hey It's Saturday	Herself sings "Wait"	TV series, 1 episode
1989;1992	The Midday Show	Herself sings "Wait"	TV series, 1 episode
1989; 1990	MTV	Herself - In Concert	TV series, 1 episode
1989	Australian MTV Awards	Herself - Presenter	TV special
1989	Countdown Revolution	Herself sings "It's Alright"	ABC TV series, 1 episode
1989; 1990	Hey Hey It's Saturday	Herself sings "It's Alright"	TV series, 1 episode
1990	MTV	Herself - Guest	TV series, 1 episode
1990	Spin	Herself sings "Black Wedding Ring"	TV series, 1 episode
1990; 1992	Hey Hey It's Saturday	Herself sings "Black Wedding Ring"	TV series, 1 episode
1990; 1992	Tonight Live With Steve Vizard	Herself - Guest Singer	TV series, 1 episode
1991	Review	Herself	ABC TV series, 1 episode
1991	A Country Practice	Herself as Singer	TV series, 1 episode
1991	Coca-Cola Australian Music Awards	Herself - Guest	TV special
1992; 1992	In Sydney Today	Herself sings "Something's Got A Give"	TV series, 1 episode
1992	Hey Hey It's Saturday	Herself sings "Something's Gotta Give"	TV series, 1 episode
1992; 1992	The Midday Show	Herself sings "Something's Gotta Give"	TV series, 1 episode
1992	Tonight Live with Steve Vizard	Herself sings "Something's Gotta Give"	TV series, 1 episode
1992	The World Tonight	Herself sings "Something's Gotta Give"	TV series, 1 episode
1992	In Sydney Today	Herself sings "Visualize"	TV series, 1 episode
1992	Today	Herself sings "Visualize"	TV series, 1 episode
1992	Tonight Live with Steve Vizard	Herself sings "Visualize"	TV series, 1 episode
1992	The Morning Show	Herself sings "Visualize"	TV series, 1 episode
1992; 1994	Sunday	Herself sings "Something's Gotta Give" / "Visualize"	TV series, 1 episode
1993	Australian Fashion Awards	Herself - Singer	TV special
1993	Aria Awards	Herself - Presenter	TV special
1993	Live And Sweaty	Herself sings "Visualize" / "Something's Gotta Give"	ABC TV series, 1 episode
1994	Ernie and Denise	Herself - Guest	TV series, 1 episode
1994	At Home	Herself - Guest	TV series, 1 episode
1994; 1994	Good Morning Australia	Herself - Guest	TV series, 2 episodes
1994	The Times	Herself - Guest	TV series, 1 episode
1994	Sunday	Herself - Singer	TV series, 1 episode
1994	Good Morning Australia	Herself - Singer	TV series, 1 episode
2016	The Morning Show	Herself sings "Wait"	TV series, 1 episode
2016	The Daily Edition	Herself sings "Johnny Guitar"	TV series, 1 episode
