= Billy the Rabbit =

Studio album by Gyan and Michael Leunig
- Released: September 2006
- Studio: The Museagency Studios
- Label: The Museagency
- Producer: Gyan, Simon Greaves

Gyan album chronology
The Invisible Bird (2003)	Billy the Rabbit (2006)	Superfragilistically (2010)

Billy the Rabbit is a collaborative album by Australians Gyan and Michael Leunig. released in September 2006, the project involves Gyan adapting several of Leunig's poems to music; with some additional lyrics contributed by Gyan. The album was released on the Muse Agency label containing a booklet of poems and illustrations by Leunig.

The album contains a duet with Paul Kelly on the closing track "The Path to Your Door" and contributions from James Cruickshank of The Cruel Sea and Tim Gaze; formerly of Rose Tattoo.

Gyan and Leuing launched the album at the Melbourne Writers Festival where Gyan sang and Leunig accompanied her whilst illustrating. The two artists' also performed together at the Byron Bay Writers Festival and performed at the Sydney Opera House in March 2007 and the Adelaide Cabaret Festival in June 2007. The show won the Sydney Theatre Award for Best Cabaret of 2007.

== Track listing ==
1. "Artist, Leave the World of Art" (Gyan, Leunig)
2. "Shadow Minister for Joy" (Gyan, Leunig)
3. "Little Tendrils" (Gyan, Leunig)
4. "Summer Palace" (Gyan, Leunig, Tim Gaze)
5. "Magpie" (Gyan, Leunig)
6. "Billy the Rabbit" (Gyan, Leunig)
7. "The Bottle" (Gyan, Leunig, James Cruikshank)
8. "Us" (Gyan, Leunig, Cruikshank)
9. "Manifesto" (Gyan, Leunig)
10. "Daffodils" (Gyan, Leunig)
11. "Literature" (Gyan, Leunig)
12. "Precious Vote" (Gyan, Leunig, Simon Greaves)
13. "The Missile" (Gyan, Leunig)
14. "Poor Old Mother Earth" (Gyan, Leunig)
15. "Let It Go" (Gyan, Leunig)
16. "The Smile" (Gyan, Leunig)
17. "Owed to Autumn" (Gyan, Leunig)
18. "The Path to Your Door" (featuring Paul Kelly) (Gyan, Leunig, Cruikshank)
