= Maribyrnong =

The Maribyrnong River is a significant river in Melbourne, Australia.

Maribyrnong may also refer to:

- Maribyrnong, Victoria, a suburb of Melbourne named after the river
- Maribyrnong College, formerly Maribyrnong High School, a secondary school in the suburb of Maribyrnong
- City of Maribyrnong, a Victorian local government area through which the river passes
- Division of Maribyrnong, an electoral district for the same area in the federal Australian House of Representatives
