= Flute Australia Volume 2 =

Studio album by Geoffrey Collins and David Miller
- Released: 1988
- Genre: Classical music
- Label: MBS Records

Flute Australia Volume 2 is an album by Geoffrey Collins and David Miller. Released in 1988 it is the second in a series put out by 2MBS-FM. It features a series of works from different composers performed by David Miller on piano and Geoffrey Collins on flute. It was nominated for the 1990 ARIA Award for Best Classical Album.

== Track listing ==
1. Sonata (for flute and piano) / Richard Meale
2. Evanston Song / Nigel Butterley
3. Songs of Sea and Sky / Peter Sculthorpe
4. Movement (for flute and piano) / Roger Smalley
5. Sonata (for solo flute) / Larry Sitsky
