= Suburban Opera =

Studio album by Gyan
- Released: October 2003
- Label: The Museagency

Gyan chronology
Reddest Red (1992)	Suburban Opera (2003)	Billy The Rabbit (2006)

Alternative cover
- Alternate artwork

Suburban Opera is the third studio album by Australian singer-songwriter, Gyan. The album was released in October 2003.

The album was originally going to be released under the title The Invisible Bird with tracks recorded with United States producer, Desmond Child, in 2000 to 2001.

The album contains "Don't Hide Your Wild Away", which was released as a promo-only single, and Gyan's version of "Love Is an Army", which was covered by LeAnn Rimes on that artist's album, Twisted Angel.

The CD is exclusively available from Gyan's website and features cover art by Australian artist, Michelle Dawson. The download version initially included the bonus track, "Life's Great If You Don't Weaken" which had previously been available on the soundtrack to the Australian film, The Nugget. The album was eventually released digitally under its original title.

== Track listing ==
1. "Don't Hide Your Wild Away" (Gyan Evans a.k.a. Gyan, G. Burr)
2. "40,000 Years B.C." (Gyan)
3. 'Bravery Award' (Gyan/T. Gaze'
4. "Everything Must Come Undone" (Gyan, C. MacColl)
5. "Love Is an Army" (Gyan)
6. "Suburban Opera" (Gyan, C. MacColl)
7. "Flowers for the Enemy" (Gyan, C. MacColl)
8. 'Black Crow' (Joni Mitchell)
9. "Where You're Sleeping" (Gyan, T. Sponder)
10. "Dance of the Lonesome Girls" (Gyan, Sponder)
11. "Security Jumper" (Gyan)
