= This Girl's in Love =

Studio album by Gyan
- Released: 26 October 2015
- Studio: The Museagency Studios
- Producers: Gyan, Simon Greaves

Gyan chronology
Superfragilistically (2010)	This Girl's in Love (2015)

This Girl's in Love is the sixth studio album by Australian singer-songwriter Gyan, released on 26 October 2015. The album consists of cover versions of songs by John Lennon, Neil Young, Kate Bush and Tom Waits as well as a re-recording of her own 1989 single, "Wait".

The album was a result of a successful Kickstarter campaign which raised over $25,000 to make the record.

== Critical reception ==
Noel Mengel of news.com.au wrote "Gyan is in sparklingly good voice and the understated small orchestra arrangements she uses frequently here are ravishing" calling Gyan an "underrated Australian talent".

== Track listing ==
1. "Johnny Guitar"
2. "The First Time Ever I Saw Your Face"
3. "Jealous Guy"
4. "Moon River"
5. "What'll I Do?"
6. "Alfie"
7. "Tumbleweed"
8. "The Man with the Child in His Eyes"
9. "Un Homme Et Une Femme"
10. "Oh My Love"
11. "Wait #2"
12. "I'm Still Here"
