= John Bromell =

Australian music executive and publisher

John William "Brom" Bromell (15 May 1940 – 31 August 2013) was an Australian musician, music publisher, and music industry executive. He began his career in the early 1960s as a drummer, performing with beat groups including The Cicadas, before relocating to the United Kingdom under the new name the Gibsons. As a performer, Bromell toured across Europe and Africa before returning to Australia in 1968.

Following his performance career, Bromell became a figure in Australian music publishing. He held senior roles at Essex Music, founded the Australian branch of Rondor Music in 1973, and later served as managing director of Warner/Chappell Music Australia from the early 1980s until his retirement in the mid-1990s. During this time, he signed numerous award-winning artists, including Cold Chisel, INXS, Midnight Oil, and Troy Cassar‑Daley.

Bromell was also involved in music industry governance and advocacy. He served on the boards of APRA (Australasian Performing Right Association) and AMCOS (Australasian Mechanical Copyright Owners Society), co-founded the annual Golden Stave charity luncheon, and helped establish the contemporary music program at Southern Cross University. In 1997, he co-founded Support Act, a music industry charity providing crisis support for artists and professionals.

After retirement, John served as Vice Chairman of the Country Music Association of Australia and was awarded the Association's Industry Award in 1996.

Bromell died in 2013 near Coffs Harbour, New South Wales, at the age of 73. He is remembered as an advocate for Australian music, both through his work in publishing and his efforts to support and develop the industry.

== Early life and family ==
John Bromell (15 May 1940 – 31 August 2013) was raised in Moonee Ponds, Victoria. John began his career in the early 1960s as a drummer in local beat groups, learning to play from Billy Hyde. He first played drums with the Impalas, later renamed Gigsaw.

In 1962, Bromell married Jan Fowler, they had three children; Darren, Rebecca and Paul.

In 1963 he left The Impalas to join the Cicadas, a then well-known Sydney band. The Cicadas flew to England, renamed themselves the Gibsons, and Bromell spent the next few years in Britain playing rock venues, putting out singles. Shortly after Bromell left the band to return to Australia with his young family.

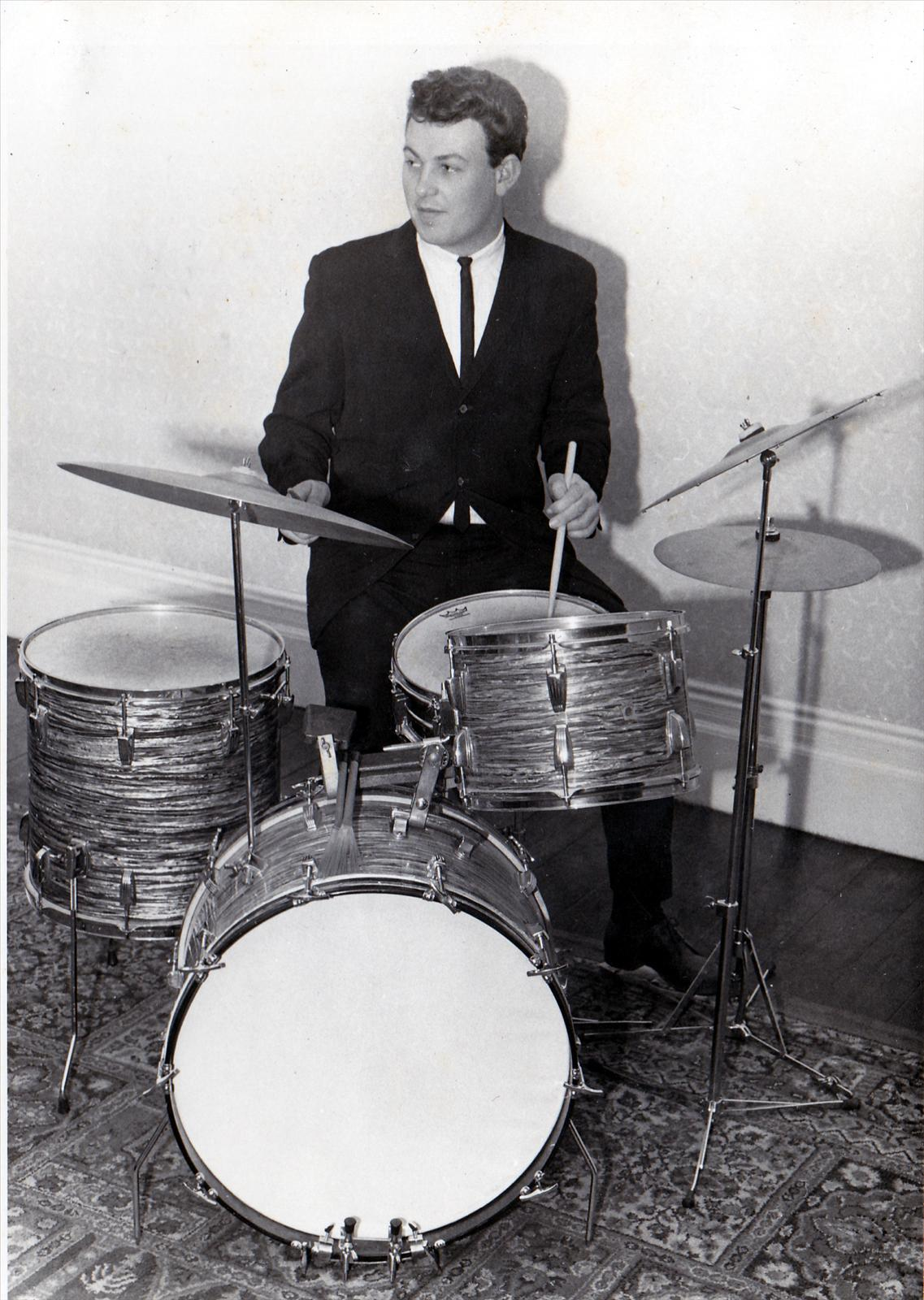
John Bromell - mid 60's

== Performative career ==
Originally a trio composed of John Rigby, Geoff Dart and John Kaye and named "The Hi-Fi's", the band added Bromell in as their fourth member in 1963, signed to RCA Victor, changed their name, and in 1964 released their first single That's What I Want". The song reached No. 1 in Brisbane and No. 5 in Sydney. The band issued Hey Wha' D'Ya Say as the flipside.

The Cicadas toured nationally, appearing on Bandstand and Six O'Clock Rock before touring Australia and New Zealand alongside Billy J Kramer, Robie Porter and Billy Thorpe and The Aztecs.

Their second RCA single, "I Need You", was penned by Johnny Devlin. After releasing a cover of the Marauders' "Always on My Mind", the group relocated to the United Kingdom and rebranded themselves as The Gibsons. They signed a deal with Philip and Dorothy Solomon's Major Minor label.

Over the next four years they toured Europe and Africa and released around a dozen singles, including "The Magic Book," and "Two Kinds of Lovers".

== Publishing career ==
After returning from England, Bromell transitioned into the music publishing industry. He took the Professional Manager role with Essex Records in 1968, where he produced acts such as the psychedelic rock group Taman Shud's, The Flying Circus and John Farnham.

In 1975, Bromell was the opened the Australian branch of Rondor Music (the publishing branch of A&M Records), and served as its first managing director. The label was seen as a "tremendously successful" under his leadership.

Throughout the 70's and early 80's he served as a frequent Australian Correspondent and occasional writer for Billboard Magazine.

In 1981 he joined Warner Music Australia as Creative Director - which became Warner Chappell Music in 1988, Bromell stayed on during the merge. He remained head of Warner Chappell until his retirement in 1997.

During his tenure at Essex, Rondor and Warner Chappell, Bromell signed Cold Chisel on a three‑year publishing deal by handshake in 1977. He also signed INXS and Midnight Oil, and many country writers and artists such as Garth Porter, Lee Kernaghan, Tania Kernaghan and Fiona Kernaghan, Gina Jeffreys, Troy Cassar‑Daley, and Jim Haynes. One industry account notes Bromell had an "eye and ear for talent" with 60 of his signings reaching Australia's Top 10 charts. Jimmy Barnes has credited Bromell as the catalyst for AC/DC being signed.

== Industry leadership ==
Bromell served on the boards of performing-rights organizations APRA and AMCOS and was a regular speaker at music fund-raisers and education seminars. He was an advocate for the rights of artists and their intellectual work.

In 1978 Bromell was in the group that established an annual music industry charity luncheon, Golden Stave. In 1980, he joined the Lunch Committee for the second annual Golden Stave Luncheon, held at Sebel Townhouse Hotel, raising $8,000 (appx. $42,000 when adjusted for 2024 inflation) for The Paraplegic and Quadriplegic Association. The money raised was met 4-to-1 thanks to a federal government subsidy, making the earnings of the day closer to $40,000 (appx. $210,000 adjusted). This charity event has raised over $14 million over 35 years.

The founding of Support Act was the culmination of a 17-year effort that began in 1980, when Bromell first proposed the concept. Bromell lobbied key figures within the Australian music industry to support his vision with financial backing from ARIA, PPCA, and APRA AMCOS. He served as a founding director and original board member of Support Act along with Jacqui Bromell, and Jane English. Support Act was officially incorporated as a public limited company on 7 August 1997 and launched the following day, 8 August. The organization was granted charitable status in 2000.

In 1991, he became a director and founding member of the Australian Contemporary Music Institute at Southern Cross University in Lismore. He served as vice-chairman of the Country Music Association of Australia, which had honored him with an Industry Achiever Award in 1996.

In 1995, Bromell was honored by becoming the subject of The Golden Turkey in front 600 industry peers. The event was a seated comedy roast established by Parkinson's NSW with Peter Dawkins as Chairman

After retiring from Warner Chappell in 1998, Bromell moved to Coffs Harbour in northern New South Wales and turned his attention to country music development. In 2006 he was announced as the first Executive Officer of the Australian Institute of Country Music (based in Gympie, Queensland) after pushing for its launch.

Also in 2006, Bromell instigated the Cyclone Larry benefit concert through the Endeavour Foundation and John Farnham, this event that raised $150,000 for the victims of Cyclone Larry

== Death ==
John Bromell died on 31 August 2013 near his home in Coramba (a village near Coffs Harbour). He was 73 years old. Reports indicated he suffered a heart attack while driving, causing his car to crash. Bromell was survived by his three children, Darren, Rebecca and Paul; as well as by his two grandchildren, Jason and Jade, and his sister, Jenny. His passing was marked by tributes from across the Australian music community, many recalling his significant impact on local songwriters and performers.
