= Wait (Gyan song) =

Single by Gyan

from the album Gyan
- Released: August 1989
- Length: 3:42
- Label: WEA
- Songwriter(s): Gyan Evans, Garry Frost, Geoffrey Stapleton
- Producer(s): Charles Fisher

Gyan singles chronology
"Wait" (1989)	"It's Alright" (1989)

"Wait" is the debut single by Australian recording artist Gyan from her self-titled debut album. The song was released in August 1989 as the album's lead single and peaked at number 14 on the ARIA charts.

At the ARIA Music Awards of 1990, the song was nominated for Breakthrough Artist - Single.

In 2015, Gyan re-recorded the track for her album This Girl's in Love, retitling it "Wait #2".

== Track listings ==
- CD/7" single
1. "Wait" - 3:42
2. "Love in Question" - 3:42

== Charts ==
=== Weekly charts ===
Chart (1989/90)	Peak position
Australia (ARIA)	14

=== Year-end charts ===
Chart (1989)	Position
Australia (ARIA)	58
