= The Hoochie Coochie Men =

Australian blues group

- Origin: Australia
- Genres: Hard rock Blues rock
- Years active: 2001–2007
- Labels: Edel
- Members: Bob Daisley; Tim Gaze; Rob Grosser; Jon Lord (former, recurring)

The Hoochie Coochie Men was a renowned Australian blues group composed of former Rainbow, Black Sabbath and Ozzy Osbourne bass player Bob Daisley, guitarist and singer Tim Gaze and drummer Rob Grosser. The recurring member of the band was former Deep Purple keyboard player Jon Lord who first performed with The Hoochie Coochie Men in February 2003 after an injury which prevented him from performing his usual concert setlist on piano. The band was also joined on stage by various harmonica players. The Hoochie Coochie Men's second studio album, Danger. White Men Dancing features guest performances from vocalists Ian Gillan, Jimmy Barnes and Jeff Duff.

The Hoochie Coochie Men was also the name of the All-Stars in 1964 when Cyril Davies died and Long John Baldry took the band over and renamed it. In 1965 the band morphed into The Steampacket.

== Discography ==
- 2001 The Hoochie Coochie Men
- 2003 Live at the Basement (recorded on 7 February 2003, released on 23 November 2003 and 9 December 2003)
- 2007 Danger. White Men Dancing
