= Gyan (album) =

Studio album by Gyan
- Released: 16 October 1989
- Studio: Trafalgar Studios, Sydney
- Genre: Pop
- Length: 41:47
- Label: WEA
- Producer: Charles Fisher

Gyan chronology
| Gyan (1989) | Reddest Red (1992) |

Singles from Gyan
- 1. "Wait" Released: August 1989; 2. "It's Alright" Released: November 1989; 3. "Black Wedding Ring" Released: February 1990

Gyan is the debut studio album by Australian singer-songwriter Gyan, released in October 1989. The album peaked number 27 on the ARIA chart and was certified gold.

At the ARIA Music Awards of 1990, the album was nominated for three awards; winning the ARIA Award for Best New Talent.

== Track listing ==
1. "Train of Thought" (Gyan) – 2:54
2. "Wait" (Gyan / G.Frost / G.Stapleton) – 3:38
3. "Straight Lines" (Gyan/O'Connor) – 4:38
4. "Lead Me On" (Gyan/O'Connor) – 2:44
5. "How Can You" (Gyan) – 4:18
6. "Head over Heels" (Gyan/O'Connor) – 3:05
7. "It's Alright" (Gyan) – 3:43
8. "Don't Ask Me Why" (Gyan) – 4:53
9. "Couldn't I Be?" (Gyan/O'Connor) – 3:30
10. "Don't Underestimate Me" (Gyan) – 3:32
11. "Black Wedding Ring" (Gyan/O'Connor) – 4:52

== Personnel ==
- Gyan: Vocals, Keyboards, drum programming
- Mark O'Connor: Keyboards, drum programming
- Rick Chadwick: Keyboards
- Rex Goh, Bret Williams, David Sparks: Guitars
- Geoff Mercer: Dobro on "Straight Lines"
- Jackie Orszaczky: Bass, additional keyboards, drum programming
- Hamish Stewart: Drums, percussion
- Hanuman Dass: Drums, drum programming
- Sunil Da Silva: Percussion
- Jump Back Jack Horn Section: Horns
- Andy Thompson: Saxophone on "Wait"

== Charts ==
Chart performance for Gyan
| Chart (1989–1990) | Peak position |
|---|---|
| Australian Albums (ARIA) | 27 |

== Certifications ==
Certifications of Gyan
| Region | Certification | Certified units/sales |
|---|---|---|
| Australia (ARIA) | Gold | 35,000^{^} |
^{^} Shipments figures based on certification alone.
