= Superfragilistically =

Studio album by Gyan
- Released: 5 July 2010
- Label: The Museagency

Gyan chronology
Billy the Rabbit (2006)	Superfragilistically (2010)	This Girl's in Love (2015)

Superfragilistically is the fifth studio album by Australian singer-songwriter Gyan that was released in October 2010.

Gyan said the album was four years in the making. "I came to this record with the idea of capturing precious little moments of beauty and holding them up just long enough to take their picture before they run for cover, like most endangered species, Thus SuperFRAGILE, and the 'istically' part of the title [is] a little present for Julie Andrews?"

== Critical reception ==
Superfagilistically was named Album of the Week on ABC Radio National's Daily Planet.

Bruce Elder from Sydney Morning Herald gave the album a four-star review, calling it "intensely beautiful, emotionally honest, sensitive and seductive". Matt Hill from The Northern Rivers Echo called it "a magical series of vignettes that feels like a book of short stories by the likes of Roald Dahl, Peter Carey or Gabriel Garcia Marquez". The Brisbane Courier called it a "staggeringly beautiful record".

== Track listing ==
Superfragilistically track listing
No.	Title	Length
1.	"Fowl Play"	2:33
2.	"Triple Why"	1:54
3.	"Priest"	3:32
4.	"Jehova"	2:01
5.	"Girl With a Long Fuse"	2:23
6.	"I Love You & Let You Go"	3:10
7.	"Come Settle You Down"	3:23
8.	"Superfragilistically"	4:26
9.	"www."	2:13
10.	"Reruns"	2:03
11.	"I've Lost the Sea"	4:00
12.	"Every Finger"	4:03
13.	"Time"	3:21
14.	"aSLEEP (Coda)"	1:37
Total length:		40:39
