= Reddest Red =

Studio album by Gyan
- Released: 12 October 1992
- Producer: Charles Fisher

Gyan chronology
Gyan (1989)	Reddest Red (1992)	The Invisible Bird (2003)

Singles from Reddest Red
- 1. "Something's Gotta Give" Released: August 1992; 2. "Visualise" Released: November 1992

Reddest Red is the second studio album by Australian singer-songwriter Gyan, released in October 1992. The album peaked at number 105 on the ARIA charts.

Two singles were released from the album: "Something's Gotta Give" and "Visualize". The song "Will I With U" was later used in the film The Sum of Us and released on the soundtrack album to the film. New Zealand musician Dave Dobbyn played guitar on the album and contributed backing vocals.

== Track listing ==
All songs by Gyan except where noted.

1. "Good News"
2. "Something's Gotta Give" (Gyan/Tim Gaze)
3. "Take From Me"
4. "Visualize"
5. "Mountain"
6. "Rooms By The Sea"
7. "Dancing on Doomsday"
8. "I Don't Believe (Love Will Ever Die)"
9. "Thing Called Love"
10. "Reddest Red"
11. "Will I With U"
12. "Thought I Knew Myself"

== Charts ==
Chart (1992)	Peak position
Australia (ARIA)	105
