= Geoffrey Collins (musician) =

Australian musician

- Born: Adelaide

Geoffrey Collins is an Australian flautist. Along with David Miller he was nominated for the 1990 ARIA Award for Best Classical Album for their album Flute Australia Volume 2.

Collins is Principal Flute for the Adelaide Symphony Orchestra and a member of Australia Ensemble.

== Disocography ==
=== Albums ===
List of albums, with selected details
Title	Details
Flute Australia (with David Miller)	Released: 1983; Format: LP; Label: MBS Records (MBS6)
Flute Australia Volume 2 (with David Miller)	Released: 1988; Format: LP, CD, Cassette; Label: MBS Records (MBS 13CD)
Enchanted Dreams ... Exotic Dances (with Alice Giles)	Released: 1994; Format: CD; Label: Tall Poppies (TP031)
Spinning	Released: 1995; Format: CD; Label: Tall Poppies (TP069)

== Awards and nominations ==
=== ARIA Music Awards ===
The ARIA Music Awards is an annual awards ceremony that recognises excellence, innovation, and achievement across all genres of Australian music. They commenced in 1987.

Year	Nominee / work	Award	Result	Ref.
1990	Flute Australia Volume 2 (with David Miller)	Best Classical Album	Nominated	
