= Robert Allworth =

Australian composer

Robert Allworth OAM
- Born: Robert Graham Allworth; 10 March 1943; Sydney, New South Wales, Australia
- Died: 26 February 2017 (aged 73)
- Genre: Classical

Robert Cooper Allworth OAM (10 March 1943 - 26 February 2017) was an Australian composer. His album of his composition Last Look at Bronte was nominated for the 1987 ARIA Awards for Best Classical Album.

In the 1997 Australia Day Honours he was awarded the Medal of the Order of Australia (OAM) for "service to music as a composer and as an advocate of other Australian composers' works".

== Biography ==
Robert Cooper Allworth, was born as Robert Graham Allworth on 10 March 1943, the only child of Australian Army officer, Kenneth Reginald Allworth (11 December 1905 – 26 March 1969) and Gwendolyn (née Jones, c. 1906–5 May 1969). He was raised in the northern Sydney suburb of Denistone. While a school student he undertook piano lessons and studied musical theory. As a teenager he was inspired by Arnold Schoenberg's "12-tone style of modern classical music." Late in 1969, after his parents' deaths, he returned to Denistone where he lived with his domestic partner, William Parsons.

His composition, "Past Horizons", was written in 1964 for solo piano. In 1965 one of his piano sonatas was chosen for performance in Stockholm by the International Society of Contemporary Music. In December 1995 "Past Horizons" was recorded by Larry Sitsky at radio station 2MBS and issued on The Glasshouse Suite: Music of Australian Composers by various artists in the following year via Jade Records.

== Discography ==
=== Albums ===
List of albums, with selected details
Title	Details
Last Look at Bronte	Released: 1986; Format: LP; Label: Possum Records (POSSUM 10)
Where No Shadows Fall (with David Miller)	Released: 1988; Format: LP; Label: Jade Records (JAD LP1004)
The Glasshouse Suite: Music of Australian Composers with Olive Anderson, Lawrence Bartlett, Colin Brumby, Ann Carr-Boyd, Eric Gross, Dulcie Holland, Larry Sitsky, Derek Strahan)	Released: 1996; Format: CD; Label: Jade Records (JADCD 1057)
Concerto Grosso (Music of Australian Composers) (with Mary Mageau, Holland, Brumby, Gross)	Released: 1999; Format: CD; Label: Jade Records (JAD LP1004)

== Awards and nominations ==
=== ARIA Music Awards ===
The ARIA Music Awards is an annual awards ceremony that recognises excellence, innovation, and achievement across all genres of Australian music. They commenced in 1987.

Year	Nominee / work	Award	Result	Ref.
1987	Last Look at Bronte	Best Classical Album	Nominated	
