= Kahvas Jute =

Australian rock band

- Origin: Sydney, New South Wales, Australia
- Genres: Progressive rock; hard rock
- Years active: June 1970–July 1971, May 1973–May 1974, (May 1974–December 1977 as Chariot), 1993–1994, 2005–2006
- Labels: Infinity, Festival, Basement Discs
- Past members: Bob Daisley; Dannie Davidson; Tim Gaze; Dennis Wilson; Scott Maxey; Peter Roberts; John Strangio; Dannie Davidson; Steve Webb; Mark Marriott
- Website: www.kahvasjute.com

Kahvas Jute were an Australian rock band formed in July 1970. The mainstay of the line-up was Dennis Wilson on guitar and vocals. Other founder members include Bob Daisley on bass guitar and Tim Gaze on lead guitar and vocals. Their sole album Wide Open was released in January 1971. The group supported Bo Diddley on his second tour of Australia in October 1973. Australian rock music historian Ian McFarlane described their style as "expansive and free flowing, strong on rhythm and melody and bristling with exceptional guitar work". Kahvas Jute did a reunion gig in 1991. Wide Open was re-released in 1993 on CD. In 2005, they played a reunion show at the Basement in Sydney which was recorded and filmed. A DVD and album pack entitled Then Again: Live at the Basement was issued in 2006.

== History ==
=== Formation ===
Kahvas Jute were formed in Sydney in June 1970 as a progressive rock and hard rock band with Tim Gaze on lead guitar and vocals (ex-Stonehenge, Tamam Shud), Dennis Wilson on lead guitar and vocals (ex-Riddles, Kevin Bible and the Book, Barrington Davis and the Power Pact, Mecca), Bob Daisley on bass guitar (ex-Dennis Williams and the Delawares, Gino Affair, Throb, Barrington Davis and the Power Pact, Mecca) and Dannie Davidson on drums (ex-Strangers, Sunsets, Tamam Shud). Wilson was the guitarist on Kevin Bible and the Book's single, "Rockin' Pneumonia", which was released in August 1966. Wilson played with Daisley in Barrington Davis and the Power Pact, which was renamed as Mecca in 1968. In 1969, Barrington Davis left to return to England and Mecca continued as a trio. Davidson's earlier band, Strangers (aka Four Strangers) had formed in Newcastle in 1964. By 1965, after releasing two singles, they became the Sunsets, a surf rock group and issued five further singles. They relocated to Sydney and were renamed as Tamam Shud in 1968, Gaze joined in 1969. Mecca disbanded in mid-1970 and Daisley and Wilson approached Davidson and Gaze to form a new band, Kahvas Jute.

=== Wide Open (1971) ===
Kahvas Jute developed a reputation for their live performances and signed with Festival Records' subsidiary label Infinity Records. They issued their sole album Wide Open in January 1971. It was recorded at Festival Studios in Sydney and produced by Pat Aulton. By the time that the album appeared, Gaze had already returned to Tamam Shud, and Kahvas Jute continued as a trio. In June 1971, Davidson and Wilson travelled to the United Kingdom and temporarily used Mick Smith and Scott Maxey on bass guitar. Daisley arrived in London in July 1971 but Kahvas Jute did not reform. Daisley remained in the UK and became a member of several bands, including Chicken Shack, Mungo Jerry, Widowmaker, Rainbow, the Blizzard of Ozz, the Ozzy Osbourne Band, Uriah Heep and the Gary Moore Band, among others.

=== Chariot (1973–1977) ===
Kahvas Jute were reformed by Davidson and Wilson with bassist Scott Maxey in May 1973, after Wilson and Davidson returned from the UK. The group supported Bo Diddley on his second tour of Australia in October. In March 1974, Peter Roberts (ex-Band of Light) replaced Maxey on bass guitar but the group was renamed in May as Chariot. Davidson left to join Band of Light and was replaced by Steve Webb on drums. Meanwhile, Roberts switched to guitar and John Strangio joined on bass guitar. The group performed about 300 gigs a year but extensive line-up changes reduced their recording output to two singles, "I'll Keep on Loving You" (January 1976) and "Set Me Free" (December 1976). With Wilson as the only mainstay, Chariot continued until December 1977. In December 1980, Wilson issued his debut solo album, Walking on Thin Ice.

=== Later reformations ===
In November 1991, the original lineup of Kahvas Jute (Daisley, Davidson, Gaze and Wilson) played one reunion gig. The 1971 album Wide Open was re-released on CD in December 1993. In 2005, Kahvas Jute reunited without Davidson (Mark Marriott was on drums) at the Basement in Sydney. A CD/DVD of that show entitled Then Again: Live at The Basement was released in September 2006.

== Band members ==
- Dennis Wilson – guitars, lead and backing vocals (6/1970–7/1971, 5/1973–12/1977, 1993–1994, 2005–2006, ex-Riddles, Kevin Bible and the Book, Barrington Davis and the Power Pact, Mecca)
- Tim Gaze – guitars, lead and backing vocals, piano (6/1970–7/1971, 1993–1994, 2005–2006, ex-Stonehenge, Tamam Shud)
- Bob Daisley – bass, backing vocals (6/1970–7/1971, ex-Dennis Williams and the Delawares, Gino Affair, Throb, Barrington Davis and the Power Pact, Mecca)
- Scott Maxey – bass (5/1973–3/1974, ex-Nutwood Rug Band)
- Peter Roberts – bass (3–5/1974, ex-the La De Da's, Band of Light, the Band of Talabene), guitar (5/1974–??)
- John Strangio – bass (5/1974–??)
- Dannie Davidson – drums (6/1970–7/1971, 5/1973–5/1974, 11/1991)
- Steve Webb – drums (5/1974–??)
- Mark Marriott – drums (2005–2006)

== Discography ==
=== Studio albums ===
List of albums, with selected chart positions
Title	Album details	Peak chart positions
Title	Album details	AUS
Wide Open	Released: March 1971; Format: LP; Label: Infinity Records (SINL 934030)	27

=== Singles ===
Year	Title	Album
1971	"Free"	Wide Open
