= Peter Wesley-Smith =

Australian legal scholar and opera librettist (born 1945)

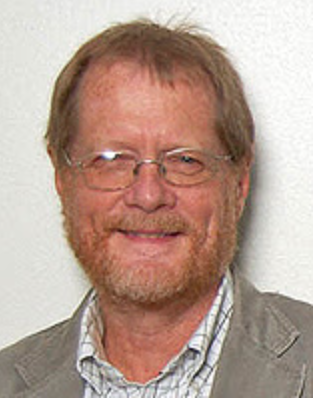
- Born: 10 June 1945 (age 81); Adelaide
- Education: University of Adelaide; University of Hong Kong
- Occupations: legal scholar, librettist
- Employer: University of Hong Kong
- Relatives: Martin Wesley-Smith (twin brother)

Peter Wesley-Smith (born 10 June 1945) is an Australian librettist and legal scholar. He often worked as the librettist with his identical twin brother, composer Martin Wesley-Smith, on work that crosses a range of musical styles, including choral music, operas, computer music, music theatre, chamber and orchestral music, and audiovisual pieces that integrate words, music and images. Wordsmith Peter Wesley-Smith and composer Martin Wesley-Smith were known as Australia's counterparts to "Ira and George Gershwin” Two main themes dominated the Wesley-Smith collaborations: the life, work and ideas of Lewis Carroll as portrayed in their rock opera BOOJUM!, and the plight of the people of East Timor.

== Life ==
Peter Wesley-Smith was born, one of two identical twin boys, the other Martin Wesley-Smith, in Adelaide. He had two older brothers, Rob Wesley-Smith, also an activist in Timor, and Jerry Wesley, a jazz pianist. His parents were part of the Adelaide establishment. His father was the Academic Registrar of the University of Adelaide, and his mother was a teacher and a presenter of the ABC's radio program Kindergarten of the Air.

Peter and Martin Wesley-Smith were both conscripted to go to Vietnam, but avoided military service by undertaking studies until conscription ended. Peter avoided conscription by studying law and history at the University of Adelaide followed by a Commonwealth Fellowship to earn a D.Phil. from the University of Hong Kong which, beyond fulfilling his natural predilection for research, delayed induction into the Australian army until national conscription was abolished. His Ph.D. thesis was published by Oxford University Press as Unequal Treaty 1898-1997 (1980, revised in 1998) and became a resource for the discussions that took place from the 1970s through the 1990s on the future of Hong Kong. It was referred to by the British negotiators, and the Chinese government had it translated into Chinese and a hundred copies distributed to cadres involved in the negotiation process. He also wrote a Reference to the Hong Kong Legal System published by Oxford University Press. Peter Wesley-Smith served as Dean of the Faculty of Law of the University of Hong Kong from 1993 to 1996.

== Compositions ==
Peter wrote the lyrics, and Martin composed the music for a number of works inspired by the life and works of English writer Lewis Carroll, notably the rock opera BOOJUM! Quito, a "documentary music drama" with text by Peter Wesley-Smith, has been called their magnum opus. Its subject is a young East Timorese refugee, Francisco Baptista Pires ("Quito"), a sufferer of schizophrenia who was found hanged in a Darwin hospital. The radiophonic score uses a recording of Quito singing one of his own songs. They were particularly known for the political content of their work:

"Moved by events in newspapers and news bulletins, he peopled and peppered his works with references to urgent international issues—Vietnam, Afghanistan, Timor and now West Papua—and with pointed, pithy commentaries on things like pesticides, media doublespeak, and global warming".

However, while much of his work was serious, often dealing with tragic issues and events, it also incorporated humour, usually in the form of satire and irony. They said in an interview in 2005:

...We think it's very effective if you can get people laughing and crying at the same time, or in some of the audio-visual things, there's something very beautiful and yet it's incredibly sad at the same time, they seem to be contradictory emotions but in fact one enhances the other, so I'm very conscious of that. If we can find these moments where you're laughing and suddenly think, 'Oh I shouldn't be laughing, this is serious', it can be a very powerful response in someone.

Both Wesley-Smith brothers moved back to the Kangaroo Valley south of Sydney after Peter returned to Australia from Hong Kong and Martin retired from teaching at the Sydney Conservatory of Music.
