= Maribyrnong College =

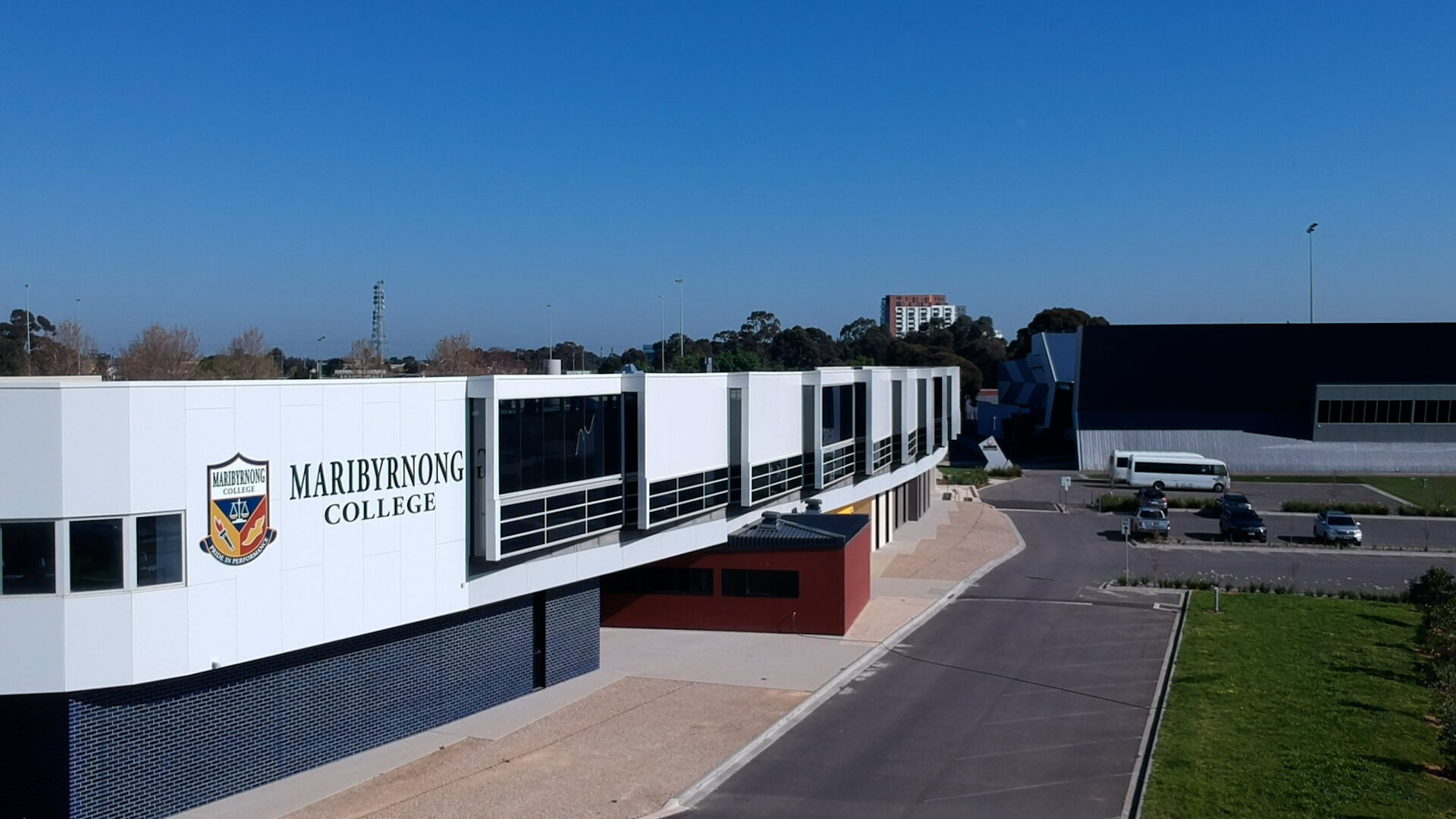
- Maribyrnong College entrance and elevated classrooms, in 2020

Location
- Maribyrnong, Melbourne, Victoria; Australia; 37.7790°S 144.8882°E

Information
- Other name: Maribyrnong Secondary College
- Former name: Maribyrnong High School
- School type: Public sports high school
- Motto: Pride in performance (formerly "Achievement with honour")
- Established: 1958; 68 years ago
- Principal: Michael Keenan
- Grades: 7–12
- Enrolment: ~1300
- Campus: Suburban
- Colours: Red, yellow, blue
- Nickname: Marby
- Team name: Marby Jets
- Website: maribsc.vic.edu.au

Maribyrnong College, also known as Maribyrnong Secondary College, and formerly known as Maribyrnong High School, is a government-funded secondary day school that specialises in sports, located in Maribyrnong in the inner western suburbs of Melbourne, Victoria, Australia. Students enrol based on local residence and/or in the selective sports academy. The school offers an accelerated learning program to prospective students who demonstrate academic ability.

It is located on River Street, Maribyrnong (formerly Maidstone until this part of Maidstone was rezoned in the 1990s). Founded in 1958, as Maribyrnong High School, a state-of-the-art sports complex opened on 22 June 2010.

== History ==
Maribyrnong College's (Maribyrnong High School) old logo in the 1950s.

The college has a long history in the suburbs of Maidstone and Maribyrnong as it was established in 1958. The area has changed dramatically since the college first opened, and it is now seen as an inner-city college as it is located eight kilometres (five miles) from Melbourne CBD.

Maribyrnong College's old logo in ~2007

Maribyrnong had a special place in terms of multicultural history among Melbourne's high schools. Being so close to the Maribyrnong Migrant Hostel (now closed), the school had an integration program for children from the hostel who were from all around the world, including many refugees.

== Specialist Sport Program ==
In 2005, the school commenced its specialist sport program, Maribyrnong Sports Academy, with selective entry for talented sports students. Enrollments have grown: in 2007 there were 56 Specialist Sport students from a total school enrolment of 380; in 2010 there were 450 students involved in the sports program from a total school enrolment of 900. Several sports receive a major focus: Australian rules football, basketball, soccer, swimming and tennis. The school has extensive partnerships with the Western Bulldogs, Victorian Institute of Sport, Australian Institute of Sport and Victoria University.

== Buildings and facilities ==
Maribyrnong College has one campus that is divided into 5 building blocks. They are: the P block, the A block, the B block, the C block and the M block.

The M block, the newest addition to the school, was completed in 2019 and sought to remove the relocatable classrooms once used. It serves as a Victorian Certificate of Education student centre, accompanying the VCE study hall. Several extra-curricular workshops and kitchen-hybrid rooms are used by the general school population. In total, the College boasts over 50 classroom environments, a 230-seat theatre and its 7000 square metre Sport Stadium with classrooms for Health and Physical Education.

=== Sports Stadium ===
The Sports Stadium which opened on 22 June 2010 includes two basketball-netball courts, six badminton courts, a 40-metre (130 ft) sprint track and a full size gym. It was officially opened by the Premier of Victoria, John Brumby. The school is still adding extra features to the facility.

== Transport ==
Tram 82 (Footscray - Moonee Ponds) stops right in front of the school on River Street. Bus services to Highpoint Shopping Centre also provide close public transport to the school. The Maribyrnong River is only a short walk from the college and the Maribyrnong River Trail can be used by students to commute to school.

== Notable alumni ==
- Rory Atkins, AFL footballer for the Adelaide Football Club
- Libby Birch, AFLW player
- Jordan Boyd, AFL player for Carlton
- Zak Butters, AFL footballer for the Port Adelaide Football Club
- Jack Bytel, AFL footballer for the St Kilda Football Club
- Doug Chappel, comedian
- Monique Conti, AFLW player/basketballer
- Jordan Croft, AFL footballer for the Western Bulldogs
- Paul Curtis, AFL footballer
- Massimo D’Ambrosio, AFL footballer
- Tony Dodemaide, cricketer for the Australian national team
- Johnny Furphy, basketballer
- Holly Furphy, soccer player
- Kerry Greenwood, author and lawyer
- Emerson Jeka, AFL footballer
- Mary Leunig, cartoonist, artist, and activist
- Michael Leunig, cartoonist
- Ellie McKenzie, AFLW footballer
- Touk Miller, AFL footballer for the Gold Coast Football Club
- Buku Khamis, AFL footballer for the Western Bulldogs
- Jess Fitzgerald, AFLW footballer
- Adam Korsak, CFL punter
- Aliesha Newman, AFLW footballer
- Fergus O'Neill, cricketer (fast bowler), Victoria, Melbourne Renegades
- Georgia Patrikios, AFLW footballer
- Mark Philippoussis, world-ranked professional tennis player who was runner-up 1998 US Open
- Georgie Prespakis, AFLW footballer
- Luke Ryan, AFL footballer for the Fremantle Football Club
- Joel Smith, AFL footballer for the Melbourne Football Club
- Amy Smith, AFLW footballer
- Kayne Turner, AFL footballer for the North Melbourne Football Club
- Guy Walker, cricketer for the Melbourne Renegades, and AFL footballer for the Melbourne Football Club
- Peter Wright, AFL footballer for the Essendon Football Club
- Jin Woodman (born 2009), Australian wheelchair tennis player
