= Tim Gaze =

Australian musician and producer (born 1953)

- Also known as: The Timster
- Born: 8 August 1953 (age 73); Melbourne, Victoria, Australia
- Genres: Blues, rock, hard rock
- Occupations: Musician; singer; songwriter; producer
- Instruments: Guitar, vocals
- Years active: 1969–present
- Labels: Full Moon, Bombora
- Website: timgaze.com

Tim Gaze (born 8 August 1953) is an Australian rock and blues guitarist, songwriter, singer, and producer. He was a member of several Australian groups from the 1960s to 1990s including Tamam Shud (1969–1970, 1970–1972, 1993–1995), Kahvas Jute (1970), Ariel (1973–1974) and Rose Tattoo (1985–1987). He also had a solo music career and released the albums, Band on the Run (film soundtrack, 1979), Rough Trade (1992), Blue Sierra (1996) and Blues Remedy (1998). In April 2008 he issued a retrospective compilation covering both his group and solo work, Reckless Love: the Tim Gaze Anthology.

== Biography ==
Tim Gaze, at the age of 14, was a member of Stonehenge from 1968 replacing Ray Ferguson on guitar and vocals, alongside Nigel Macara on drums, Ross Ward on guitar and vocals, and Warren Ward on bass guitar. Gaze joined his first major band, Tamam Shud, in late 1969 in Sydney, replacing founding member Zac Zytnic, on lead guitar and vocals. Other members were Peter Barron on bass guitar, Lindsay Bjerre on vocals and guitar, and Dannie Davidson on drums. Gaze initially played with the progressive rock group for about six months but quit suddenly, around June 1970, just after recording their second album, Goolutionites and the Real People, which was released in October.

Gaze and Davidson then formed another progressive rock band, Kahvas Jute, in mid-1970 with Bob Daisley on bass guitar, and Dennis Wilson on lead guitar and vocals. Gaze contributed his first compositions to their only album, Wide Open (released in January 1971).

Soon after its recording Gaze rejoined Tamam Shud, remaining with them until the band broke up in August 1972. Also in the line up was former Stonehenge bandmate, Macara on drums. During this period Tamam Shud provided three tracks for the soundtrack of the Australian surfing film, Morning of the Earth, which became the first Australian film soundtrack to earn a gold record award.

In late 1972, after Tamam Shud disbanded, Gaze and Macara formed Miss Universe with George Limbidis on bass guitar and Phillip Pritchard on guitar. Early in the following year they rehearsed with Ross Hannaford and Ross Wilson (both ex-Daddy Cool) but after about a month Gaze left and Macara followed.

Gaze and Macara were founding members of Ariel, another progressive rock group, which formed in 1973, alongside John Mills on keyboards, Bill Putt on bass guitar, and Mike Rudd on guitar and vocals (all ex-Spectrum). Aside from guitar and vocals, Gaze co-wrote tracks for the group's debut album, A Strange Fantastic Dream (December 1973), including their first single, "Jamaican Farewell" (September). He remained with the group until April 1974 and then joined the Stevie Wright Band to tour Australia until the end of that year.

Gaze was a member of John Paul Young and the Allstars on guitar during 1975. In the following year he joined Headland alongside Neville Barker, Peter Bolton, Mick Norris, Bruce Parkinson and Judy Parkinson. In that year he founded Tim Gaze Rock Ensemble with Peter Blyton on bass guitar, Bolton on keyboards and Robbie France-Shaw on drums. Dayride followed in 1977, which included Gaze, Blyton and Bolton. Tim Gaze Band followed soon after and, in 1979, they supplied tracks for the surfing film, Band on the Run. The soundtrack album was re-released in a 2× CD format in 2004; the 1979 line-up was Gaze on guitar and vocals; Bolton on keyboards; Harry Curtis on bass guitar; France on drums and percussion; Annette Henery on vocal and percussion; and Suzanne Petersen on vocals, guitar, flute and piano.

In 1985 Gaze, on slide guitar, became a member of hard rockers, Rose Tattoo, alongside Angry Anderson on lead vocals, Andy Cichon on bass guitar, keyboards and piano, Scott Johnston on drums and John Meyer on lead guitar. The line-up released a cover version of Steppenwolf's "Born to be Wild". Meyer left and the group recorded an album, Beats from a Single Drum (1986), as a four-piece for Mushroom Records. The band separated by the end of 1987, Anderson re-released Beats from a Single Drum as his solo album. It provided Anderson's debut single, "Suddenly" (July 1987), which peaked at No. 2 on the Kent Music Report Singles Chart.

Gaze established his own recording studio and performed in several different bands from the late 1980s to the early 1990s. He was a member of Pete Wells Band in 1991 with Wells on guitar, slide guitar and lead vocals (ex-Rose Tattoo); Lucy De Soto on piano, keyboards and backing vocals; Warwick Fraser on drums (ex-Feather, The Screaming Tribesmen); and Michael Vidale on bass guitar (ex-Jimmy and the Boys). In the following year Tim Gaze Trio issued an album, Rough Trade. From 1992 to 1995 he periodically worked for Gyan including on her second album, Reddest Red (October 1992), for which he co-wrote her single, "Something's Gotta Give" (August) and backing her singing with acoustic guitar for her solo shows.

In March 1993 Tamam Shud reformed with the line-up of Gaze, Barron, Bjerre and Macara. They issued a single, "Stay" (June 1994), and followed with an album, The Permanent Culture (August). The group toured until April 1995 and disbanded again. Gaze returned to studio and session work. In 1996 he recorded his solo album, Blue Sierra, with studio musicians Pamela Jo Drysdale on accordion, Rob Grosser on drums, Damien Kennedy on bass guitar and Glen Muirhead on piano and keyboards. According to Australian musicologist, Ian McFarlane, it is "an exceptional release. The material ranged from the tough blues rocker 'Easy Mama' and the gypsy-tinged 'Let It Rain', to the gorgeous acoustic ballad 'Say Goodbye'. Prominent throughout was Gaze’s always-tasteful guitar playing." To support the release Gaze formed Blue Sierra with Grosser and Kennedy.

Gaze and Grosser founded Tim Gaze and the Blues Doctors with Daniel Barnett on brass, Jim Conway on harmonica (from Backsliders), Ralph Franke on brass, Graeme Gibb on bass guitar and Mike Gubb on piano and organ. They issued an album, Blues Remedy (1998), on Full Moon Records. McFarlane described how "Gaze went back to his roots, with covers of blues material like Little Walters' 'Blues with a Feeling' and Bukka White's 'Parchman Farm Blues', sitting alongside quality Gaze-penned originals like 'Hell to Pay' and 'Riverside Blues'."

In 2001 Gaze and Grosner formed the Hoochie Coochie Men with former Kahvas Jute member, Daisley. Conway joined the group on harmonica. They released a self-titled debut album in that year, which Hector of Undercover News described as "a 39 minute party animal. Like Paul Christie did with the Party Boys in the 80s, Daisley and crew have produced an equally loose and fun record in their self titled debut. It combines some blues classics with some very credible new music written by Daisley, Gaze and Grosser." Hector felt that "As accomplished musicians themselves, these guys know how to recreate a great song. Cream's 'Strange Brew', Johnny Winter's 'Dallas' and Jimmy Vaughan's 'Six Strings Down' are not necessarily your obvious band covers but familiar by their quality sounds."

The Hoochie Coochie Men issued two albums with Jon Lord on keyboards (from Deep Purple), Live at the Basement (live album, November 2003) and Danger. White Men Dancing (December 2007). On 14 April 2008 Gaze issued a 2× CD compilation album of both his group and solo work, Reckless Love: the Tim Gaze Anthology. As of 2025, Gaze is currently headlining a Dire Straits/Eric Clapton tribute show, Slowhand Sultans, which performs regularly in the Brisbane area. Other members of the band include Mick Melit, Ian Lock and Tom De Voss.
