= Mary Leunig =

Australian visual artist (born 1950)

Mary Leunig (born 1950) is an Australian visual artist who has had work featured in such publications as The Age, Meanjin, Nation Review, Heat Magazine, AWU Magazine, Time, Penthouse, Der Rabe, and The Meatworkers Journal.

== Life and career ==
Mary Leunig grew up in Maidstone, Melbourne where she attended Footscray North State School and Maribyrnong High School. Leunig has two sisters, and her brother, Michael Leunig (1945–2024), was also a popular and accomplished cartoonist and poet. She began studying art at Prahran Institute of Technology, and later Preston Institute of Technology, where she completed her studies, majoring in drawing and printmaking. Her future husband was also a student at Prahran.

Her cartoons are drawn in pen and watercolour with black lines and vibrant colours. Her work often includes political and feminist themes and usually contains elements that are humorous or confronting.

== Personal life ==
Leunig married Leon Norster (born 1950) Sand they have two children. She lives and works in Bendigo.

== Published work ==
Leunig has published five anthologies of work.

- Leunig, Mary (1982), There's No Place like Home, Penguin, ISBN 978-0-14-006443-8
- Leunig, Mary (1986), A Piece of Cake, Penguin, ISBN 978-0-14-009339-1
- Leunig, Mary (1992), One Big Happy Family, Penguin, ISBN 978-0-14-017097-9
- Leunig, Mary (1993), Black and White and Grey, Penguin, ISBN 978-0-14-023263-9
- Leunig, Mary (2018), One Good Turn, The Lifted Brow, ISBN 978-1-92-570410-5
