= Martin Wesley-Smith =

Australian composer (1945–2019)

Martin Wesley-Smith AM (10 June 1945 – 26 September 2019) was an Australian composer with an eclectic output ranging from children's songs to environmental events. He worked in a range of musical styles, including choral music, operas, computer music, music theatre, chamber and orchestral music, and audiovisual pieces which bring words, music and images together. He often worked with his librettist brother, Peter Wesley-Smith.

He was one of the pioneers of computer, or electronic, music.

Two main themes dominated Wesley-Smith's music: the life, work and ideas of Lewis Carroll, and the plight of the people of East Timor.

== Life ==
Wesley-Smith was born, one of twin boys, in Adelaide. He had two other brothers. His parents were part of the Adelaide establishment. His father was the academic registrar of the University of Adelaide, and his mother was a teacher and a presenter of the ABC's radio program Kindergarten of the Air.

He studied composition at the University of Adelaide. From his student days, Wesley-Smith was a rebel, moonlighting on the banjo with a folkie band, the Wesley Three, when his teachers would have preferred he focus on his classical studies. His teachers included Peter Maxwell Davies, Jindřich Feld, Sándor Veress and Richard Meale.

Wesley-Smith and his twin brother, Peter, were both conscripted to go to Vietnam, but avoided military service by undertaking studies until conscription ended.

He earned his D.Phil. from the University of York in England.

Wesley-Smith lived in the Kangaroo Valley south of Sydney, where he was a member of the Kangaroo Valley-Remexio Partnership which supports projects in East Timor. He died there on 26 September 2019, aged 74.

His work is being jointly archived by the National Library of Australia and the National Film and Sound Archive.

== Musical career ==
Wesley-Smith returned to Australia from the UK in 1974 to teach composition and electronic music at the Sydney Conservatorium of Music. Here he founded and directed its Electronic Music Studio. He established the first computer music studio in China at the Central Conservatory of Music in Beijing in 1986, and he taught at the University of Hong Kong in 1994–95. He retired from the Conservatorium in 2000.

From the start Wesley-Smith was eclectic in his composition. He created an early Moog #3 piece in 1970 called Vietnam Image. At the same time he composed songs for children's radio and television programs. He was able to "write, sing and record real tunes, as well as esoteric orchestral and chamber music". An interviewer in 2005 describes his eclecticism as follows: "There aren't many composers that I can think of anywhere in the world who have the breadth of activity that you have, writing songs for Playschool and writing pieces for the Tasmanian Symphony Orchestra, and writing music theatre pieces and writing straight out agit-prop".

Wesley-Smith often worked with his wordsmith twin-brother, Peter ("Ira to his George").

He was particularly known for the political content of his work:

Moved by events in newspapers and news bulletins, he peopled and peppered his works with references to urgent international issues – Vietnam, Afghanistan, Timor and now West Papua – and with pointed, pithy commentaries on things like pesticides, media doublespeak, and global warming.

However, while much of his work was serious, often dealing with tragic issues and events, it also incorporated humour, usually in the form of satire and irony. He said in an interview in 2005:

...I think it's very effective if you can get people laughing and crying at the same time, or in some of the audio-visual things, there's something very beautiful and yet it's incredibly sad at the same time, they seem to be contradictory emotions but in fact one enhances the other, so I'm very conscious of that. If we can find these moments where you're laughing and suddenly think, 'Oh I shouldn't be laughing, this is serious', it can be a very powerful response in someone.

In addition to his works on political issues, he also composed a number of works inspired by the life and works of English writer Lewis Carroll.

=== Compositions ===
Quito, a "documentary music drama" with text by Peter Wesley-Smith, has been called his magnum opus. Its subject is a young East Timorese refugee, Francisco Baptista Pires ("Quito"), a sufferer of schizophrenia who was found hanged in a Darwin hospital. The radiophonic score uses a recording of Quito singing one of his own songs.

Other works about East Timor include:

- Kdadalak (For the Children of Timor), his first audio-visual piece about East Timor, commissioned by The Seymour Group, a contemporary Music Ensemble founded by Vincent Plush
- The Struggle Continues, composed at the request of the Tasmanian Symphony Orchestra.
- Welcome to the Hotel Turismo, "inspired by an article about Joao Pereira, who had worked at the Dili hotel since Portuguese times. The piece is a journey through sound of the 24 years of Indonesian occupation. It begins with the sound of breaking glass, briefly becomes a cabaret song like something by Kurt Weill, and transforms into a rhapsodic cello solo".

East Timorese leader José Ramos-Horta described Wesley-Smith as a "model political artist", saying that "He creates works of art which are political, and manages to make politics artistic. He is a true creator, activist and humanitarian. All at once. He and his brothers are treasures of our country."

The clarinettist Ros Dunlop commissioned Papua Merdeka, which Wesley-Smith described as "a piece about the West Papuan people and their thirst for freedom".

=== Performances ===
Wesley-Smith led an electronic music and audio-visual performing group, watt, from 1976 to 1998. The group performed internationally, as well as in a regular series of concerts in Sydney. He was also musical director of TREE, a group whose final environmental event was held at Wattamolla Beach in Sydney's Royal National Park in 1983.

The Song Company has performed his work in Amsterdam, den Bosch, Denmark, Gent, Groningen, Hong Kong, Malaysia and Portugal, as well as throughout Australia.

== Awards ==
=== Don Banks Music Award ===
The Don Banks Music Award was established in 1984 to publicly honour a senior artist of high distinction who has made an outstanding and sustained contribution to music in Australia. It was founded by the Australia Council in honour of Don Banks, Australian composer, performer and the first chair of its music board.

Year	Nominee / work	Award	Result
1987	Martin Wesley-Smith	Don Banks Music Award	Won

- 1997: Paul Lowin Composition Award for the music drama Quito
- 1998: AM for services to "music, as a composer, scriptwriter, children's songwriter, lecturer, presenter of multi-media concerts and a member of various Australia Council boards and committees"
- 2014 Ordem de Timor Leste

== Selected works ==
- Alice in the Garden of Live Flowers (for seven harps) (2008)
- Pi in the Sky (1971 opera)
- The Wild West Show (1971)
- Machine (1972)
- Kdadalak (For the Children of Timor) (1977)
- Who Killed Cock Robin (1979, for chamber choir)
- For Marimba and Tape (1983)
- Snark-Hunting (1984, for flute, keyboards, percussion, cello and tape) (inspired by Lewis Carroll's The Hunting of the Snark)
- Venceremos! (1984, for tape and transparencies)
- Boojum! in concert : nonsense, truth and Lewis Carroll (1986; with Peter Wesley-Smith) (inspired by Lewis Carroll's The Hunting of the Snark and Alice in Wonderland)
- Quito (1994, documentary music drama; with Peter Wesley-Smith)
- X (1999, multimedia piece for clarinet and CD ROM)
- Welcome to the Hotel Turismo (2000, multimedia piece for cello, or bass clarinet, and CD ROM)
- Weapons of Mass Distortion (2003, an audio-visual piece for clarinet in B-flat and Macintosh computer)
- A Luta Continua (2005, oratorio for baritone, girls' choir and orchestra; with Peter Wesley-Smith)
- Papua Merdeka (2007 – audio-visual piece for bass clarinet and Macintosh computer)
