= Michael Leunig =

Australian cartoonist (1945–2024)

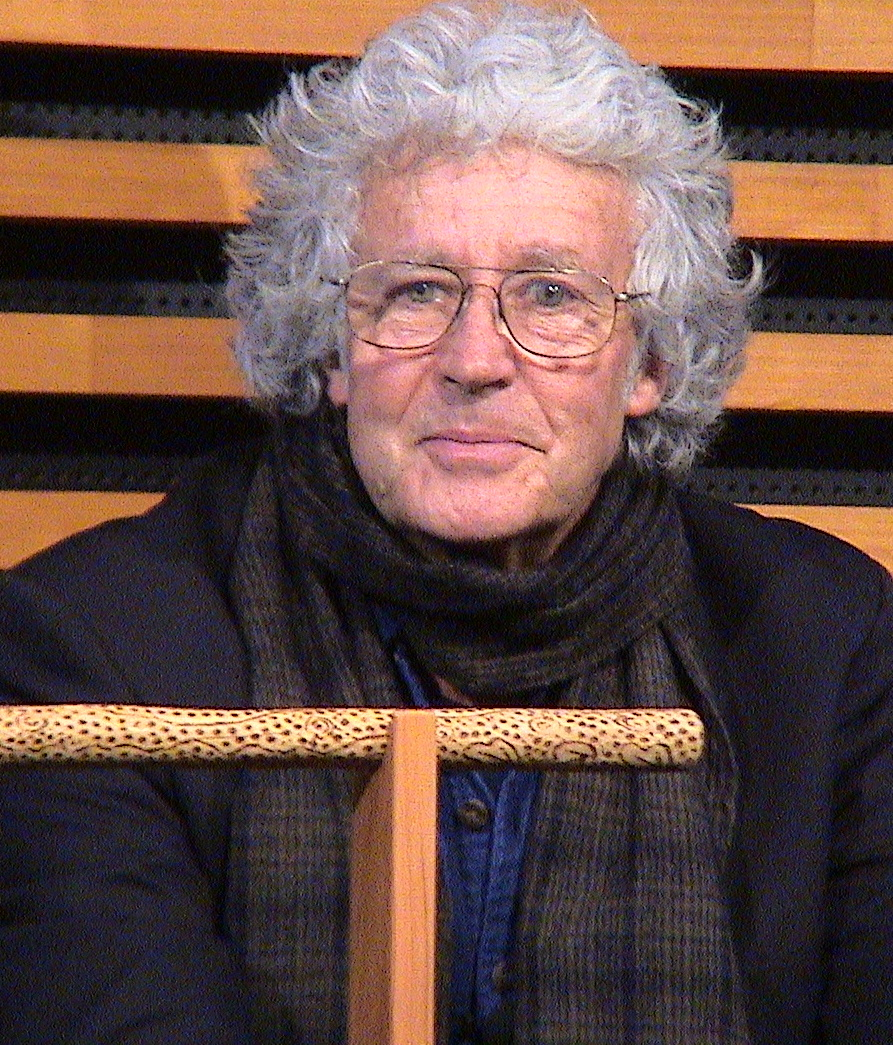
- Leunig in 2012
- Born: 2 June 1945; East Melbourne, Australia
- Died: 19 December 2024 (aged 79); Melbourne, Australia
- Education: Swinburne Film and Television School
- Occupations: Cartoonist; poet; artist
- Years active: 1965–2024
- Relatives: Mary Leunig (sister)
- Website: leunig.com.au

Michael Leunig (2 June 1945 – 19 December 2024), typically referred to by his pen name Leunig, was an Australian cartoonist, poet and artist. He was best known for his work for Melbourne's The Age and The Sydney Morning Herald.

Leunig's works include The Curly Pyjama Letters, the cartoon books The Essential Leunig, The Wayward Leunig, The Stick, Goatperson, Short Notes from the Long History of Happiness and Curly Verse as well as The Lot, a compilation of his "Curly World" newspaper columns. Leunig also wrote several books of prayers, including A Common Prayer, The Prayer Tree and When I Talk To You.

Leunig was declared an Australian Living Treasure by the National Trust of Australia in 1999.

== Early life and education ==
Leunig, a fifth-generation Australian, was born on 2 June 1945 in East Melbourne, the eldest of five children. He said he traced his family's ancestry to the Harz, Holy Roman Empire (now Germany), in the 16th century. He grew up in Footscray, an inner western suburb of Melbourne, where he went to Footscray North Primary School. He then went to Maribyrnong High School, but as the school had not finished being built, he first had to attend classes held at the nearby Melbourne Showgrounds in Ascot Vale. He twice failed his final year examinations.

After working as a labourer in an abattoir, Leunig enrolled at the Swinburne Film and Television School, where he was at first interested in making documentaries.

Leunig was conscripted in the Vietnam War call-up, but he registered as a conscientious objector; he was rejected on health grounds when it was revealed that he was deaf in one ear.

== Career ==
Leunig began his cartoon career while studying at Swinburne in 1965 when his cartoons appeared in the Monash University student newspaper Lot's Wife. In the early 1970s his work appeared in the radical/satirical magazines Nation Review, The Digger and London's Oz magazine, as well as mainstream publications including Newsday and Woman's Day.

The main outlet for Leunig's work was the daily Fairfax Media newspapers, Melbourne's The Age and The Sydney Morning Herald. The Australian Broadcasting Corporation also provided airtime to Leunig to discuss his views on a range of political and philosophical issues.

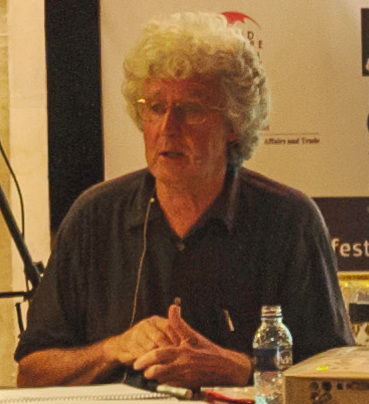
Leunig in 2013

Leunig continued to contribute cartoons for the Saturday edition of The Age and The Sydney Morning Herald until he was sacked in August 2024, along with a number of other staff, as a cost-cutting measure.

== Cartoons ==
=== Style and themes ===
Leunig's drawings were done with a sparse and quivering line, usually in black and white with ink wash; the human characters often drawn with exaggerated noses. This style served him well in his early years, when he gained a loyal following for his quirky take on social issues. He also made increasingly frequent forays into a personal fantasy world of whimsy, featuring small figures with teapots balanced on their heads, grotesquely curled hair and many ducks.

Leunig frequently satirised concepts such as Americanisation, greed, consumerism, corporations, and warmongering, in a personal proclamation against the "war on terror". Readers and critics took special note of his parodies of political matters, especially those concerning former Australian prime minister John Howard and former American president George W. Bush. These earned Leunig a description as a "political cartoonist", although only some of his works were political in nature or reference. His work also frequently explored spiritual, religious and moral themes.

From a very early stage in his career, Leunig often included his own handwritten poetry within his cartoons; subsequently he also published books of poetry. He was very open about his themes in interviews about his work.

=== Characters ===
In the series of cartoons that Leunig created, a number of characters persistently appeared, including:

- The Duck
- Mr Curly – a contented character who is at ease in the natural world
- Vasco Pyjama – a restless wanderer who sometimes seeks the counsel of Mr Curly

=== Controversial works ===
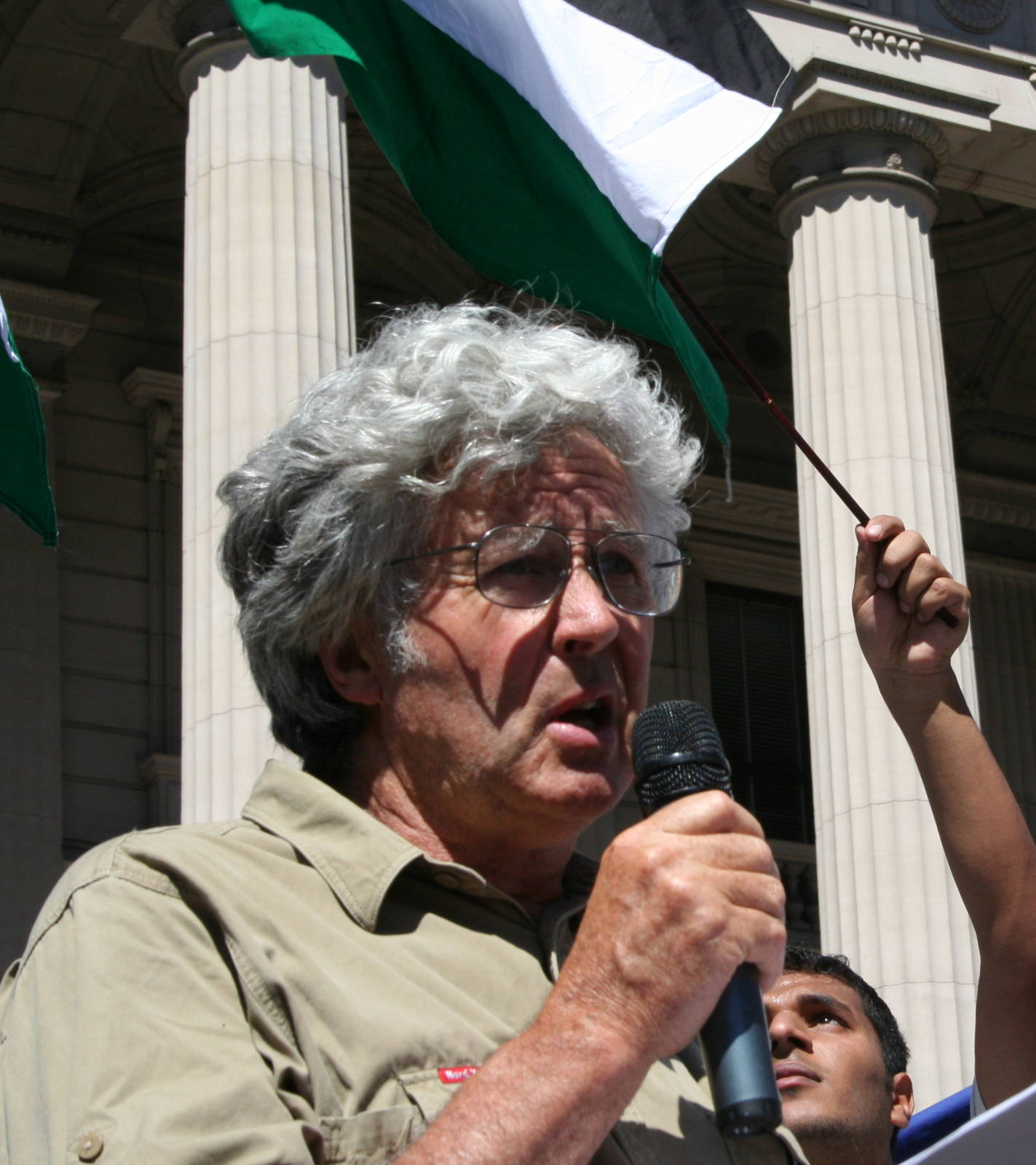
Leunig speaks at a demonstration in Melbourne against Israel's military action in the Gaza War, 2009

Leunig's cartoons were occasionally a source of controversy. A colleague referred to his return to political cartooning in the late 1990s as his "Bob Dylan goes electric" moment. In 2008, he wrote that "Artists must never shrink from a confrontation with society or the state."

Leunig opposed the 2003 invasion of Iraq, commenting that "if a cartoonist is representing the government line on Iraq, they're nothing better than a propagandist".

In 2006, Fairfax Media partially censored a Leunig cartoon criticising the then prime minister, John Howard; the cartoon was published in Victoria but not in New South Wales.

Leunig stated his opposition to the Israeli government. Three of his cartoons between 2004 and 2006 drew letters of protest nationally and internationally. He partially defined his position in 2006, saying that the Israeli government had "gravely mishandled" the situation in Palestine, and "it bothers me deeply. It is my right to express it."

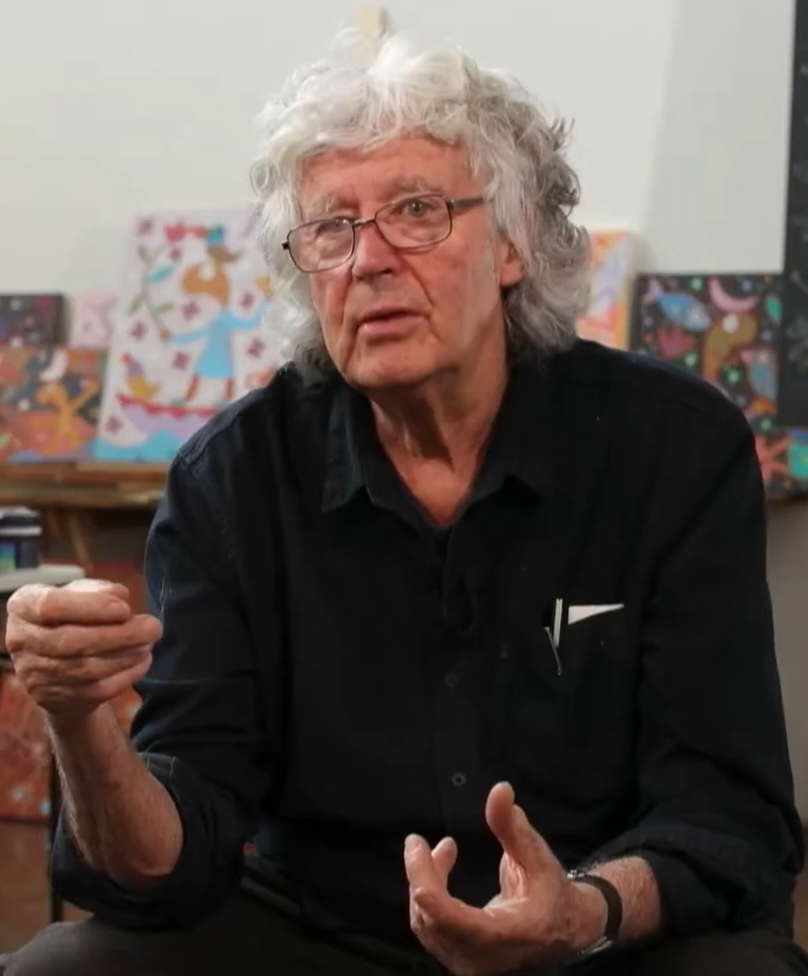
Leunig's appearance on the Portrait Story series of the National Portrait Gallery, Australia, 2017

A supposed Leunig cartoon came to international attention after it was entered in an Iranian competition conceived by the newspaper Hamshahri as retaliation for the Muhammad cartoons controversy. Leunig denied he had submitted the cartoon, and demanded that it be withdrawn, which it was. It later emerged that the cartoon had been submitted as a prank by Richard Cooke, a contributor to the Australian comedic team The Chaser.

In 2018, Leunig's 30-year association with the Melbourne Comedy Festival came to an end, after artists expressed concerns about being associated with Leunig's anti-vaccination views and his opposition to the marriage equality plebiscite. Leunig had designed the logo for the festival each year since 1988.

In 2021, Leunig's cartoon contributions for the editorial page in the Monday edition of The Age were ended following the paper's rejection for publication of a cartoon he had drawn in response to COVID-19 vaccination requirements in Australia. The cartoon compared resistance to vaccine requirements to the Tank Man in Tiananmen Square.

== Honours ==
- 1999: Designated as a National Living Treasure by the National Trust of Australia.
- Leunig performed at the opening ceremony of the 2006 Melbourne Commonwealth Games, wearing a duck costume.
- 2006: 2006 APRA Music Award together with Christopher Willcock for his work on Southern Star.
- 2016: Metrosideros leunigii, the oldest described fossil species of the flowering plant genus Metrosideros, was named after Leunig.
- 2020: The Ernie Award for his cartoon of mothers "being too busy on Instagram".

== Adaptations ==
Several Leunig poems have been set to music by composers including Paul Stanhope, and, for the Song Company, the composers Alice Chance, Drew Crawford, James Wade, Kate Moore, Kate Neal, Katy Abbott, Lachlan Skipworth, Lyle Chan, Mark Viggiani, Robert Davidson and Ruth McCall. In 2006 Australian musician Gyan Evans released the album Billy the Rabbit, based on the poetry of Leunig. Gyan and Leunig launched the album at the Melbourne Writers Festival, with Leunig illustrating during Gyan's singing. They also performed together at the Byron Writers Festival and the Sydney Opera House.

== Personal life and death ==
Leunig's first marriage, to Pamela Munro, ended in divorce. He married his second wife, Helga, in 1992 but they separated in the 2010s. He was together with his last partner, Nicola Dierich, until his death. Leunig had four children. Leunig's sister, Mary Leunig, is also an accomplished cartoonist. Leunig had a studio in the Melbourne suburb of Northcote and a country property in north-east Victoria.

A documentary film about Leunig's life by Kasimir Burgess, The Leunig Fragments, was released in 2020 and revealed various difficulties that he had experienced with family relationships. He did not attend his parents' funerals and was not in regular contact with his siblings.

Leunig died in Melbourne, in the early hours of 19 December 2024, at the age of 79.

== Published works ==
Collections of press cartoons and original art and/or poems

- The Penguin Leunig, introduction by Barry Humphries (1974) (40th anniversary reissue 2014)
- The Second Leunig: a Dusty Little Swag (1979)
- The Bedtime Leunig (1981)
- A Bag of Roosters (1983)
- Ramming the Shears (1985)
- The Travelling Leunig (1990)
- A Common Prayer (1990)
- The Prayer Tree (1991)
- Introspective, foreword by Helen Garner (1991, to accompany exhibition at National Gallery of Victoria. (Reprinted as The Michael Leunig Collection 1994.)
- With Karl Rahner, A Common Philosophy, ed. John Honner (1992)
- Everyday Devils and Angels (1992)
- A Bunch of Poesy (1992)
- You and Me (1995)
- Short Notes from the Long History of Happiness (1996)
- "The Teapot of Truth" (Australia Post 1998)
- Why Dogs Sniff Each Other's Tails (1998)
- Goatperson and Other Tales (1999)
- Carnival of the Animals (2000)
- The Curly Pyjama Letters (2001)
- The Stick and Other Tales of our Times (2002)
- Poems, 1972–2002 (2003)
- Strange Creature (2003)
- When I Talk to You (2004)
- Wild Figments (2004)
- A New Penguin Leunig (2005)
- Hot ... and Bothered (2007)
- The Lot: in Words (2008)
- The Essential Leunig: Cartoons from a Winding Path (2012)
- Holy Fool (2013)
- Musings from the Inner Duck (2015)
- The Wayward Leunig: Cartoons That Wandered Off (2015)
- Ducks for Dark Times (2017)
- Get Well (2021)
- Newspaper Poems (2024)

Multi-decade compilations

- Poems: 1972–2002 (2003 hardback) later Curly Verse: Selected Poems (2010 paperback)
- The Essential Leunig: Cartoons from a Winding Path (2012)
- Holy Fool: Artworks (2014)
- The Wayward Leunig: Cartoons that Wandered Off (2015)

=== Works in the Australian National Bibliographic database ===
- The Animated Leunig (videorecording) (c2001)
- A bag of roosters / Michael Leunig (1983, ISBN 0-207-14830-9)
- The bedtime Leunig / Michael Leunig *1981, ISBN 0207145059
- A bunch of poesy / Leunig (1992, ISBN 0-207-17798-8)
- A celebration: Michael Leunig / Friends of the National Library of Australia (1997, ISBN 0-646-33090-X)
- A common prayer / Leunig (1990, ISBN 0-85924-933-6)
- A common prayer / Leunig (1993, ISBN 1-86371-231-3)
- A common prayer: a cartoonist talks to God / Leunig (1998, ISBN 1-86371-740-4)
- A conversation between Michael Leunig and Terry Laidler ... (1997)
- The curly pyjama letters / Michael Leunig (2001, ISBN 0-670-04023-1)
- The curly pyjama letters / Michael Leunig (2006, ISBN 978-0-14-300546-9 )
- English in heat / Morris Lurie, drawings by Leunig (1972, ISBN 0-207-12384-5)
- Everyday devils and angels / Michael Leunig (1992, ISBN 0-14-015911-8)
- Goatperson and other tales / Michael Leunig (1999, ISBN 0-14-029140-7)
- The happy prints: printmaking / Michael Leunig (1998)
- Introspective / Michael Leunig, with foreword by Helen Garner (1988, ISBN 1-86436-356-8)
- Introspective / Michael Leunig; with a foreword by Helen Garner (1991, ISBN 1-86372-200-9)
- Leunig's Carnival of the animals / Michael Leunig, Peter Garrett, Richard Tognetti and the Australian Chamber Orchestra (2000, ISBN 0-7329-1070-6)
- A new Penguin Leunig / Michael Leunig (1992, ISBN 0-14-017097-9)
- A new Penguin Leunig / Michael Leunig (2005, ISBN 0-14-300480-8)
- The Penguin Leunig: cartoons / by Michael Leunig, introduced by Barry Humphries (1974, ISBN 0-14-004019-6)
- Poems 1972–2002 / Michael Leunig (2003, ISBN 0-670-04091-6)
- The prayer tree / Leunig (1991, ISBN 1-86371-034-5)
- The prayer tree / Leunig (1998, ISBN 1-86371-741-2)
- Ramming the shears: a collection of drawings / Michael Leunig (1985, ISBN 0-949266-13-2)
- Ramming the shears: a collection of drawings / Michael Leunig (1990, ISBN 0-14-015801-4)
- The second Leunig, a dusty little swag: cartoons, a few verses and selected moments from the voyage of Vasco Pyjama / by Michael Leunig (1979, ISBN 0-207-14328-5)
- Short notes from the long history of happiness / Michael Leunig (1996, ISBN 0-670-87405-1)
- The stick : and other tales of our times / Michael Leunig (2002, ISBN 0-670-04048-7)
- The stick : and other tales of our times / Michael Leunig (2006, ISBN 978-0-14-300146-1
- Strange creature / Michael Leunig (2003, ISBN 0-670-04136-X)
- The travelling Leunig: cartoons / by Michael Leunig (1990, ISBN 0-14-014867-1)
- Why dogs sniff each other's tails : an old but true story / Michael Leunig (1998, ISBN 0-670-88354-9)
- Wild figments / Michael Leunig (2004, ISBN 0-14-300353-4)
- You and me: a collection of recent pictures, verses, fables, aphorisms and songs / Michael Leunig (1995, ISBN 0-14-025461-7)
