= Tamam Shud =

Australian psychedelic, progressive and surf rock band

- Also known as: Four Strangers, The Strangers, The Sunsets
- Origin: Newcastle, New South Wales, Australia
- Genres: Psychedelic rock, progressive rock, surf rock
- Years active: 1964–1972, 1993–1995, 2002, 2006, 2008–present
- Labels: CBS, Warner Bros., Polydor
- Members: Lindsay Bjerre; Peter Barron; Tim Gaze; Nigel Macara
- Past members: Gary Johns; Eric Connell; Alex Zytnik; Dannie Davidson; Kevin Stephenson; Kevin Sinott; Richard Lockwood; Larry Duryea-Taylor

Tamam Shud are an Australian psychedelic, progressive and surf rock band formed in Newcastle, New South Wales, in 1964. The initial line-up were known as The Four Strangers with Eric Connell on bass guitar, Dannie Davidson on drums, Gary Johns on rhythm guitar and Alex "Zac" Zytnik on lead guitar. At the end of that year Johns was replaced by Lindsay Bjerre on guitar and vocals as they trimmed their name to The Strangers. By late 1965 they had become The Sunsets. They took the name Tamam Shud in late 1967 after replacing Connell with Peter Barron on bass guitar. The group released two albums, Evolution (1969) – after which Tim Gaze replaced Zytnik on lead guitar – and Goolutionites and the Real People (1970) before disbanding in 1972. After a lengthy hiatus they reformed in 1993 to release a third album, Permanent Culture in 1994, but disbanded again in 1995. Beginning in 2008 the group worked together periodically on new material: it took eight years to complete their fourth album, Eight Years of Moonlight (January 2016).

== History ==
=== 1964–1973 ===
Tamam Shud evolved from an instrumental surf band, The Four Strangers, which formed in 1964 in Newcastle with Eric Connell on bass guitar, Dannie Davidson on drums, Gary Johns on rhythm guitar and Alex "Zac" Zytnik on lead guitar. They released a sole single, "The Rip", in that year for Astor Records before Lindsay Bjerre replaced Johns on guitar and lead vocals. In 1965, as the Strangers, they issued a single, "Sad and Lonely", on Festival Records – it was an R&B offering influenced by the Rolling Stones. Late that year they changed their name to the Sunsets.

The Sunsets travelled to Sydney to perform regular gigs at various venues: Surf City, the Star Club and the Sunset Discothèque. In October 1965 they released a single, "Bye Bye Goodbye", on the Leedon label and followed with "When I Found You" in March of the following year. They issued three singles on Festival, "A Life in the Sun Theme" (January 1967), "Love's Face" (June) and "The Hot Generation" (August); as well as an EP, A Life in the Sun. Their tracks were used for two surf films, A Life in the Sun (1966) and The Hot Generation (1967), both directed by Paul Witzig. Late that year Peter Barron replaced Connell on bass guitar and the group, now based in Sydney, changed their name to Tamam Shud.

Bjerre found the Persian phrase tamám shud (translated as "ended", "finished" or "the very end") in the closing words of The Rubáiyát of Omar Khayyám, an 11th-century poetry collection. The line-up of Barron, Bjerre, Davidson and Zytnik played "acid-surf progressive rock" influenced by "psychedelic sounds of Cream, The Jimi Hendrix Experience, Pink Floyd, Eric Burdon and The (New) Animals, plus the San Francisco stylings of The Grateful Dead" according to Australian musicologist, Ian McFarlane. They became a popular attraction at local discothèques and "head" venues, and, like their contemporaries Tully, they often performed in association with a Sydney film and light show collective, Ubu.

Tamam Shud recorded the group's debut album Evolution in late 1968. It was financed by Witzig, who had commissioned the music: he used four tracks on the soundtrack of his surfing film of the same name. Because of Witzig's limited budget it was recorded live-in-the-studio, over a single 2 1/2-hour session, and mixed in 1 1/2 hours, with most of the tracks being first takes. The independent recording was leased by the CBS label and they were signed to Warner Brothers records due to its popularity. It was favourably reviewed by teen pop magazine, Go-Set. McFarlane felt it was "one of the first wholly original rock albums" in Australia. Jordie Kilby and David Kilby described it as "one of the most loved soundtracks of the period" and described how "Screenings of the film with the band in attendance were popular events up and down the coast."

In 1969 Tim Gaze (ex-Stonehenge), a "16-year-old guitar prodigy", replaced Zytnik on lead guitar and co-lead vocals. Zytnik had left to join Graham Lowndes' group, Bootleg. In January 1970 Tamam Shud performed at Australia's first outdoor rock festival, the Pilgrimage for Pop, held at Ourimbah, 78 km north of Sydney. During early 1970 they recorded their second LP, the environmentally-themed, Goolutionites and the Real People (October), but in June both Davidson and Gaze left to form another progressive rock group, Kahvas Jute. McFarlane described Tamam Shud's second album as their "masterpiece, an ambitious concept suite, a carefully crafted song cycle of cosmic enlightenment and cascading acid-rock."

Bjerre replaced Davidson and Gaze with Kevin Sinott on drums and Kevin Stephenson on reeds – the group took on a jazzier musical direction. Gaze returned in late 1970 after Kahvas Jute recorded their only album, Wide Open. Sinott and Stephenson left and they recruited a new drummer, Nigel Macara, who had worked with Gaze in Stonehenge. During 1971 Tamam Shud's line-up expanded by the addition of Larry Duryea (ex Heart'n'Soul) on percussion; they were regularly augmented on stage by multi-instrumentalist, Richard Lockwood (ex-Tully), and a jazz pianist, Bobby Gebert.

The band toured solidly through 1971 and late that year, following the breakup of Tully, Lockwood became the permanent sixth member. Their next recording was the single "Got a Feeling" / "My Father Told Me", released on Warner Bros. in January 1972. The group was invited to contribute music for the soundtrack for the Alby Falzon surf movie Morning of the Earth (1971) and Falzon initially wanted Tamam Shud to provide all the music, but after G. Wayne Thomas took over as producer, other artists were added, and Tamam Shud's involvement was eventually reduced to just three tracks - the instrumental track "Bali Waters" (featuring Lockwood on flute), and the songs "Sea The Swells" and "First Things First". On the day that "First Things First" was recorded, Bjerre had throat problems, so the vocal was recorded by Tim Gaze, however, when the film premiered mid-year, the group was surprised to discover that, without their knowledge, Thomas had erased Gaze's voice and added a new lead vocal by Broderick Smith (then the lead singer of Melbourne band Carson). Gaze and Macara also provided instrumental backing for other musicians who performed songs on the soundtrack. Notwithstanding these problems, the soundtrack LP (released in May 1972) was a major commercial success, becoming the first Australian film soundtrack album to earn a gold record award, despite the fact that it received almost no airplay on Australian commercial radio. The three Tamam Shud tracks became the group's swan-song; these were compiled on the Bali Waters EP, which was issued later in 1972.

Shud continued to tour through the first half of 1972, playing the Mulwala Festival in April, and making more trips to Melbourne in May and July, but in August 1972 Bjerre announced the imminent breakup of the group, which was attributed to management problems, "fear of musical stagnation" and the band's frustration at not being able to record another LP. They played their final shows in Melbourne on 1 September 1972 at Sebastians disco, with MacKenzie Theory and Toads, 2 September at Garrison, with Madder Lake, and 3 September at Sebastians, with Blackfeather and Carson.

=== 1993–present ===
Tamam Shud reformed in 1993 with the line-up of Barron, Bjerre, Gaze and Macara to record an album Permanent Culture released in 1994 before disbanding in 1995; and reformed with the same line-up for the Long Way to the Top package tour in 2002. Tamam Shud continues to record and perform occasionally to the present, with the core lineup of Bjerre, Gaze and Macara (Barron has now retired from playing), and they have released two albums of new original material.

A Re-Mastered collection of Tamam Shud's essential music, Tamam Shud 1968–1972 was released in 2002 to coincide with the 'Long Way to the Top' tour, including:

"Evolution" (1968) Lindsay Bjerre (vocals, rhythm guitar), Peter Baron (bass), Zak Zytnik (lead guitar), Dannie Davidson (drums). Recorded at United Sound Studios, Engineered by Spencer Lee. Produced by Tamam Shud.

"Goolutionites and the Real People" (1970) Lindsay Bjerre (vocals, rhythm guitar), Peter Baron (bass, fuzz bass), Tim Gaze (lead guitar, piano), Dannie Davidson (drums). Recorded at United Sound Studios, Engineered by Maurice Wilmore. Produced by John Bromell.

"Got a Feeling" (1972) from the Bali Waters EP for the surf film Morning of the Earth Lindsay Bjerre (vocals, rhythm guitar), Peter Baron (bass, fuzz bass), Tim Gaze (lead guitar, vocals, harpsichord), Nigel Macara (drums, vocals), Richard Lockwood (sax, clarinet, flute), Larry Duryea-Taylor (congas, percussion). Recorded at PACT Studio. Produced by G Wayne Thomas.

== Members ==
=== Current members ===
- Lindsay Bjerre – lead vocals, guitar (1965–1972, 1993–1995, 2002, 2006, 2008–present), live bass (2016–present)
- Tim Gaze – guitars, backing vocals, keyboards (1969–June 1970, December 1970–1972, 1993–1995, 2002, 2006, 2008–present)
- Peter Barron – bass (1967–1972, 1993–1995, 2002, 2006, 2008–present), non-touring since 2016
- Nigel Macara – drums, backing vocals (1971–1972, 1993–1995, 2002, 2006, 2008–present)
- John Cobbin – guitar (2016–present)
- Paul 'DC' DiGiacomo – keyboards (2016–present)

=== Former members ===
- Gary Johns – guitar (1964–1965)
- Eric Connell – bass (1964–1967)
- Alex 'Zac' Zytnik – guitar (1964–1970)
- Dannie Davidson – drums (1964 – June 1970)
- Kevin Stephenson – reeds (June 1970 – 1971)
- Kevin Sinott – drums (June 1970 – 1971)
- Richard Lockwood – woodwinds (1971–1972)
- Larry Duryea-Taylor – percussion (1971–1972)

== Discography ==
=== Studio albums ===
List of albums, with Australian chart positions
Title	Album details	Peak chart positions
Title	Album details	AUS
Evolution	Released: 1969; Label: CBS (SBP 233761)	13
Goolutionites and the Real People	Released: 1970; Label: Warner Music Australia (WS 200001)	35
Permanent Culture	Released: 1994; Label: Polydor Records Australia (523442-2)	-
Eight Years of Moonlight	Released: 2016; Label: Tamam Shud	-
Resonate	Released: 2018; Label: Tamam Shud	-

=== Live albums ===
Title	Details
Live in Concert	Released: 2003; Label: Canetoad Records (CD-034)

=== Eps ===
Title	Details
Bali Waters	Released: 1971; Label: Warner Bros. Records (EPW-207)

=== Singles ===
- "Evolution" / "Lady Sunshine" (1969) CBS BA221706
- "Stand in the Sunlight" / "I Love You All" (1970) Warner Bros.
- "Got a Feeling" / "My Father Told Me" (1972) Warner Bros. WBA4007
- "Stay" / "Election Day" / "The Fire" (1994) CDS Polydor 853221-2
- "Shakin' out the Stones" / "What's Your Problem" (1994) CDS Polydor 853902-2
