= Japan at the 2020 Summer Olympics =

- IOC code: JPN
- NOC: Japanese Olympic Committee
- Website: www.joc.or.jp (in Japanese)

in Tokyo, Japan July 23 – August 8, 2021
- Competitors: 556 (295 men and 261 women) in 37 sports
- Flag bearers (opening): Rui Hachimura; Yui Susaki
- Flag bearer (closing): Ryo Kiyuna
- Medals Ranked 3rd: Gold 27 Silver 14 Bronze 17 Total 58

Summer Olympics appearances (overview)
- 1912; 1920; 1924; 1928; 1932; 1936; 1948; 1952; 1956; 1960; 1964; 1968; 1972; 1976; 1980; 1984; 1988; 1992; 1996; 2000; 2004; 2008; 2012; 2016; 2020; 2024; 2028

Japan was the host nation of the 2020 Summer Olympics in Tokyo, originally scheduled to take place from 24 July to 9 August 2020 but postponed to 23 July to 8 August 2021 because of the COVID-19 pandemic. Since the nation's official debut in 1912, Japanese athletes have appeared at every Summer Olympic Games in the modern era, except for the 1948 Summer Olympics in London, to which they were not invited due to the nation's role in World War II, and the 1980 Summer Olympics in Moscow, as part of the United States-led boycott. The flag-bearers for Japan were basketball player Rui Hachimura and wrestler Yui Susaki in the opening ceremony and karateka Ryo Kiyuna in the closing ceremony.

Japan finished the Games with 58 total medals, 27 being gold, a significant improvement upon the country's previous record performances from the 1964 Olympics (also held in Tokyo) and 2004 Olympics. This placed them third overall by gold-first ranking for the third time (after 1964 and 1968), behind the United States and China. In terms of total medals, they also fell behind the Russian Olympic Committee and the United Kingdom. It was the most successful Summer Olympics in Japan's history.

== Medalists ==
The following Japanese competitors won medals at the Games. In the by discipline sections below, medalists' names are bolded.

Medal	Name	Sport	Event	Date
Gold	Naohisa Takato	Judo	Men's 60 kg	24 July
Gold	Yui Ohashi	Swimming	Women's 400 metre individual medley	25 July
Gold	Yuto Horigome	Skateboarding	Men's street	25 July
Gold	Uta Abe	Judo	Women's 52 kg	25 July
Gold	Hifumi Abe	Judo	Men's 66 kg	25 July
Gold	Momiji Nishiya	Skateboarding	Women's street	26 July
Gold	Shohei Ono	Judo	Men's 73 kg	26 July
Gold	Jun Mizutani; Mima Ito	Table tennis	Mixed doubles	26 July
Gold	Takanori Nagase	Judo	Men's 81 kg	27 July
Gold	Yamato Fujita; Yukiko Ueno; Nozomi Goto; Yukiyo Mine; Nayu Kiyohara; Haruka Agatsuma; Yuka Ichiguchi; Yu Yamamoto; Hitomi Kawabata; Mana Atsumi; Minori Naito; Saki Yamazaki; Nodoka Harada; Sayaka Mori; Eri Yamada	Softball	Women's tournament	27 July
Gold	Yui Ohashi	Swimming	Women's 200 metre individual medley	28 July
Gold	Chizuru Arai	Judo	Women's 70 kg	28 July
Gold	Daiki Hashimoto	Gymnastics	Men's artistic individual all-around	28 July
Gold	Shori Hamada	Judo	Women's 78 kg	29 July
Gold	Aaron Wolf	Judo	Men's 100 kg	29 July
Gold	Akira Sone	Judo	Women's +78 kg	30 July
Gold	Koki Kano; Kazuyasu Minobe; Satoru Uyama; Masaru Yamada	Fencing	Men's team épée	30 July
Gold	Sena Irie	Boxing	Women's featherweight	3 August
Gold	Daiki Hashimoto	Gymnastics	Men's horizontal bar	3 August
Gold	Sakura Yosozumi	Skateboarding	Women's park	4 August
Gold	Yukako Kawai	Wrestling	Women's freestyle 62 kg	4 August
Gold	Risako Kawai	Wrestling	Women's freestyle 57 kg	5 August
Gold	Ryo Kiyuna	Karate	Men's kata	6 August
Gold	Mayu Mukaida	Wrestling	Women's freestyle 53 kg	6 August
Gold	Takuto Otoguro	Wrestling	Men's freestyle 65 kg	7 August
Gold	Yui Susaki	Wrestling	Women's freestyle 50 kg	7 August
Gold	Kōyō Aoyagi; Suguru Iwazaki; Masato Morishita; Hiromi Itoh; Yoshinobu Yamamoto; Masahiro Tanaka; Yasuaki Yamasaki; Ryoji Kuribayashi; Yūdai Ōno; Kodai Senga; Kaima Taira; Ryutaro Umeno; Takuya Kai; Tetsuto Yamada; Sōsuke Genda; Hideto Asamura; Ryosuke Kikuchi; Hayato Sakamoto; Munetaka Murakami; Kensuke Kondo; Yuki Yanagita; Ryoya Kurihara; Masataka Yoshida; Seiya Suzuki; Atsunori Inaba; Makoto Kaneko; Yoshinori Tateyama; Yoshinori Murata; Hirokazu Ibata; Masaji Shimizu	Baseball	Men's tournament	7 August
Silver	Funa Tonaki	Judo	Women's 48 kg	24 July
Silver	Daiki Hashimoto; Kazuma Kaya; Takeru Kitazono; Wataru Tanigawa	Gymnastics	Men's artistic team all-around	26 July
Silver	Kanoa Igarashi	Surfing	Men's shortboard	27 July
Silver	Tomoru Honda	Swimming	Men's 200 metre butterfly	28 July
Silver	Hifumi Abe; Uta Abe; Chizuru Arai; Shori Hamada; Hisayoshi Harasawa; Shoichiro Mukai; Takanori Nagase; Shohei Ono; Akira Sone; Miku Tashiro; Aaron Wolf; Tsukasa Yoshida	Judo	Mixed team	31 July
Silver	Kenichiro Fumita	Wrestling	Men's Greco-Roman 60 kg	2 August
Silver	Kokona Hiraki	Skateboarding	Women's park	4 August
Silver	Koki Ikeda	Athletics	Men's 20 kilometres walk	5 August
Silver	Kiyou Shimizu	Karate	Women's kata	5 August
Silver	Miu Hirano; Kasumi Ishikawa; Mima Ito	Table tennis	Women's team	5 August
Silver	Miho Nonaka	Sport climbing	Women's combined	6 August
Silver	Mone Inami	Golf	Women's individual	7 August
Silver	Moeko Nagaoka; Maki Takada; Naho Miyoshi; Rui Machida; Nako Motohashi; Nanaka Todo; Saki Hayashi; Evelyn Mawuli; Saori Miyazaki; Yuki Miyazawa; Himawari Akaho; Monica Okoye	Basketball	Women's tournament	8 August
Silver	Yumi Kajihara	Cycling	Women's omnium	8 August
Bronze	Funa Nakayama	Skateboarding	Women's street	26 July
Bronze	Takaharu Furukawa; Hiroki Muto; Yuki Kawata	Archery	Men's team	26 July
Bronze	Tsukasa Yoshida	Judo	Women's 57 kg	26 July
Bronze	Amuro Tsuzuki	Surfing	Women's shortboard	27 July
Bronze	Mikiko Andoh	Weightlifting	Women's 59 kg	27 July
Bronze	Mima Ito	Table tennis	Women's singles	29 July
Bronze	Yuta Watanabe; Arisa Higashino	Badminton	Mixed doubles	30 July
Bronze	Takaharu Furukawa	Archery	Men's individual	31 July
Bronze	Kazuma Kaya	Gymnastics	Men's pommel horse	1 August
Bronze	Mai Murakami	Gymnastics	Women's floor	2 August
Bronze	Shohei Yabiku	Wrestling	Men's Greco-Roman 77 kg	3 August
Bronze	Tsukimi Namiki	Boxing	Women's flyweight	4 August
Bronze	Ryomei Tanaka	Boxing	Men's flyweight	5 August
Bronze	Toshikazu Yamanishi	Athletics	Men's 20 kilometres walk	5 August
Bronze	Jun Mizutani; Koki Niwa; Tomokazu Harimoto	Table tennis	Men's team	6 August
Bronze	Akiyo Noguchi	Sport climbing	Women's combined	6 August
Bronze	Ryutaro Araga	Karate	Men's +75 kg	7 August

Medals by sport
**Sport**	1st place, gold medalist(s)	2nd place, silver medalist(s)	3rd place, bronze medalist(s)	Total
Judo	9	2	1	12
Wrestling	5	1	1	7
Skateboarding	3	1	1	5
Gymnastics	2	1	2	5
Swimming	2	1	0	3
Table tennis	1	1	2	4
Karate	1	1	1	3
Boxing	1	0	2	3
Baseball	1	0	0	1
Fencing	1	0	0	1
Softball	1	0	0	1
Athletics	0	1	1	2
Sport climbing	0	1	1	2
Surfing	0	1	1	2
Basketball	0	1	0	1
Cycling	0	1	0	1
Golf	0	1	0	1
Archery	0	0	2	2
Badminton	0	0	1	1
Weightlifting	0	0	1	1
Total	27	14	17	58

Medals by day
**Day**	1st place, gold medalist(s)	2nd place, silver medalist(s)	3rd place, bronze medalist(s)	**Total**
July 24	1	1	0	2
July 25	4	0	0	4
July 26	3	1	3	7
July 27	2	1	2	5
July 28	3	1	0	4
July 29	2	0	1	3
July 30	2	0	1	3
July 31	0	1	1	2
August 1	0	0	1	1
August 2	0	1	1	2
August 3	2	0	1	3
August 4	2	1	1	4
August 5	1	3	2	6
August 6	2	1	2	5
August 7	3	1	1	5
August 8	0	2	0	2
Total	27	14	17	58

Medals by gender
**Gender**	1st place, gold medalist(s)	2nd place, silver medalist(s)	3rd place, bronze medalist(s)	**Total**
Female	14	8	8	**30**
Male	12	5	8	**25**
Mixed	1	1	1	**3**
Total	27	14	17	58

== Competitors ==
The following is the list of number of competitors in the Games. Note that reserves in field hockey, football, and handball are not counted:

Sport	Men	Women	Total
Archery	3	3	6
Artistic swimming	—N/a	9	9
Athletics	41	9	50
Badminton	6	7	13
Baseball	24	—N/a	24
Basketball	12	16	28
Boxing	4	2	6
Canoeing	7	5	12
Cycling	6	7	13
Diving	4	4	8
Equestrian	9	0	9
Fencing	12	9	21
Field hockey	16	16	32
Football	18	18	36
Golf	2	2	4
Gymnastics	5	12	17
Handball	14	14	28
Judo	7	7	14
Karate	4	4	8
Modern pentathlon	1	2	3
Rugby sevens	12	12	24
Sailing	8	7	15
Shooting	6	6	12
Skateboarding	4	6	10
Softball	—N/a	15	15
Sport climbing	2	2	4
Surfing	2	2	4
Swimming	18	17	35
Table tennis	3	3	6
Taekwondo	2	2	4
Tennis	4	5	9
Triathlon	2	2	4
Volleyball	14	14	28
Water polo	13	13	26
Weightlifting	4	3	7
Wrestling	6	6	12
Total	295	261	556

== Archery ==
Japan fielded six archers (three men and three women) at the Games, as the host nation is automatically entitled to use the men's and women's team quota places.

The host nation's archery team was officially announced on March 21, 2021, with London 2012 silver medalist Takaharu Furukawa slated to shoot at his fifth consecutive Olympics.

=== Men ===
Athlete	Event	Ranking round		Round of 64	Round of 32	Round of 16	Quarterfinals	Semifinals	Final / BM	
Athlete	Event	Score	Seed	Opposition Score	Opposition Score	Opposition Score	Opposition Score	Opposition Score	Opposition Score	Rank
Takaharu Furukawa	Individual	649	46	Álvarez (MEX); W 7–3	Broeksma (NED); W 6–5	Das (IND); W 3–1	Lia Jl (CHN); W 4–0	Gazoz (TUR); L 1–4	Tang C-c (TPE); W 4–1	3rd place, bronze medalist(s)
Yuki Kawata	Individual	661	22	de Smedt (BEL); L 2–6	Did not advance					
Hiroki Muto	Individual	678	5	Shanny (ISR); L 3–7	Did not advance					
Takaharu Furukawa; Yuki Kawata; Hiroki Muto	Team	1988	4	—N/a		Bye	United States; W 5–1	South Korea; L 4–5	Netherlands; W 5–4	3rd place, bronze medalist(s)

=== Women ===
Athlete	Event	Ranking round		Round of 64	Round of 32	Round of 16	Quarterfinals	Semifinals	Final / BM	
Athlete	Event	Score	Seed	Opposition Score	Opposition Score	Opposition Score	Opposition Score	Opposition Score	Opposition Score	Rank
Ren Hayakawa	Individual	653	16	Đỗ (VIE); W 6–5	Kaufhold (USA); W 6–2	An S (KOR); L 4–6	Did not advance			
Miki Nakamura	Individual	639	31	Horáčková (CZE); W 6–2	Jang M-h (KOR); W 6–2	Wu Jx (CHN); L 1–7	Did not advance			
Azusa Yamauchi	Individual	665	7	Bishindeeg (MGL); W 6–2	Marusava (BLR); L 0–6	Did not advance				
Ren Hayakawa; Miki Nakamura; Azusa Yamauchi	Team	1957	4	—N/a		Bye	Belarus; L 3–5	Did not advance		

=== Mixed ===
Athlete	Event	Ranking round		Round of 16	Quarterfinals	Semifinals	Final / BM	
Athlete	Event	Score	Seed	Opposition Score	Opposition Score	Opposition Score	Opposition Score	Rank
Hiroki Muto; Azusa Yamauchi	Team	1343	3 Q	France; L 3–5	Did not advance			

== Artistic swimming ==
Japan as the host nation, entered a squad of eight artistic swimmers to compete in the women's duet and team event.

Athlete	Event	Technical routine		Free routine (preliminary)			Free routine (final)		
Athlete	Event	Points	Rank	Points	Total (technical + free)	Rank	Points	Total (technical + free)	Rank
Yukiko Inui; Megumu Yoshida	Duet	93.3499	4	93.9333	187.2832	4 Q	94.4667	187.8166	4
Juka Fukumura; Yukiko Inui; Moeka Kijima; Okina Kyogoku; Mayu Tsukamoto; Mashiro Yasunaga; Akane Yanagisawa; Megumu Yoshida	Team	93.3773	4	—N/a			94.9333	188.3106	4

== Athletics (track and field) ==
Japanese athletes further achieved the entry standards, either by qualifying time or by world ranking, in the following track and field events (up to a maximum of 3 athletes in each event): The team will be selected based on the results of the 2020 Japan Championships and once an athlete wins a medal in race walking and marathon, or attains the top eight position in track and field at the 2019 IAAF World Championships in Doha, Qatar.

Four marathon runners (two per gender) were the first set of Japanese track and field athletes being selected for the Games, with a top-two finish of their respective races at the Grand Championship in Tokyo on September 15, 2019. By winning the gold medals at the World Championships, race walkers Toshikazu Yamanishi and London 2012 Olympian Yusuke Suzuki were officially added to the track and field roster. Suguru Osako and Mao Ichiyama completed the nation's marathon team lineup at the Nagoya and Lake Biwa Marathon on March 8, 2020.

Key

- Note–Ranks given for track events are within the athlete's heat only
- Q = Qualified for the next round
- q = Qualified for the next round as a fastest loser or, in field events, by position without achieving the qualifying target
- NR = National record
- N/A = Round not applicable for the event
- Bye = Athlete not required to compete in round

=== Track & road events ===
==== Men ====
Athlete	Event	Heat		Quarterfinal		Semifinal		Final	
Athlete	Event	Result	Rank	Result	Rank	Result	Rank	Result	Rank
Yuki Koike	100 m	Bye		10.22	4	Did not advance			
Shuhei Tada	100 m	Bye		10.22	6	Did not advance			
Ryota Yamagata	100 m	Bye		10.15	4	Did not advance			
Abdul Hakim Sani Brown	200 m	21.41	6	—N/a		Did not advance			
Shota Iizuka	200 m	21.02	6	—N/a		Did not advance			
Jun Yamashita	200 m	20.78	5	—N/a		Did not advance			
Julian Walsh	400 m	46.57	6	—N/a		Did not advance			
Yuta Bando	5000 m	14:05.80	17	—N/a				Did not advance	
Hiroki Matsueda	5000 m	14:15.54	18	—N/a				Did not advance	
Akira Aizawa	10000 m	—N/a						28:18.37	17
Tatsuhiko Ito	10000 m	—N/a						29:01.31	22
Shunsuke Izumiya	110 m hurdles	13.28	2 Q	—N/a		13.35	3	Did not advance	
Taio Kanai	110 m hurdles	13.41	3 Q	—N/a		26.11	8	Did not advance	
Shunya Takayama	110 m hurdles	13.98	6	—N/a		Did not advance			
Takatoshi Abe	400 m hurdles	49.98	6	—N/a		Did not advance			
Kazuki Kurokawa	400 m hurdles	50.30	6	—N/a		Did not advance			
Hiromu Yamauchi	400 m hurdles	49.21	3 Q	—N/a		49.35	6	Did not advance	
Ryoma Aoki	3000 m steeplechase	8:24.82	9	—N/a				Did not advance	
Ryuji Miura	3000 m steeplechase	8:09.92	2 Q	—N/a				8:16.90	7
Kosei Yamaguchi	3000 m steeplechase	8:31.27	12	—N/a				Did not advance	
Bruno Dede*; Yoshihide Kiryu; Yuki Koike; Shuhei Tada; Ryota Yamagata	4 × 100 m relay	38.16	3 Q	—N/a				DNF	
Rikuya Itō; Kaito Kawabata; Kentarō Satō; Aoto Suzuki; Julian Walsh*	4 × 400 m relay	3:00.76	5	—N/a				Did not advance	
Yuma Hattori	Marathon	—N/a						2:30:08	73
Shogo Nakamura	Marathon	—N/a						2:22:23	62
Suguru Osako	Marathon	—N/a						2:10:41	6
Koki Ikeda	20 km walk	—N/a						1:12:14	2nd place, silver medalist(s)
Eiki Takahashi	20 km walk	—N/a						1:27:29	32
Toshikazu Yamanishi	20 km walk	—N/a						1:12:28	3rd place, bronze medalist(s)
Hayato Katsuki	50 km walk	—N/a						4:06:32	30
Masatora Kawano	50 km walk	—N/a						3:51:56	6
Satoshi Maruo	50 km walk	—N/a						4:06:44	32

==== Women ====
Athlete	Event	Heat		Semifinal		Final	
Athlete	Event	Result	Rank	Result	Rank	Result	Rank
Ran Urabe	1500 m	4:07.90	9	Did not advance			
Nozomi Tanaka	1500 m	4:02.33 NR	4 Q	3:59.19 NR	5 Q	3:59.95	8
Kaede Hagitani	5000 m	15:04.95	12	—N/a		Did not advance	
Ririka Hironaka	5000 m	14:55.87	9 q	—N/a		14:52.84 NR	9
Nozomi Tanaka	5000 m	14:59.93	=6	—N/a		Did not advance	
Yuka Ando	10000 m	—N/a				32:40.77	23
Ririka Hironaka	10000 m	—N/a				31:00.71 PB	7
Hitomi Niiya	10000 m	—N/a				32:23.87 SB	22
Masumi Aoki	100 m hurdles	13.59	7	Did not advance			
Ayako Kimura	100 m hurdles	13.25	7	Did not advance			
Asuka Terada	100 m hurdles	12.95	5 q	13.06	6	Did not advance	
Yuno Yamanaka	3000 m steeplechase	9:43.83	10	—N/a		Did not advance	
Hanae Aoyama; Yu Ishikawa*; Mei Kodama; Remi Tsuruta; Ami Saitō	4 × 100 m relay	43.44	7	—N/a		Did not advance	
Mao Ichiyama	Marathon	—N/a				2:30:13	8
Honami Maeda	Marathon	—N/a				2:35:28	33
Ayuko Suzuki	Marathon	—N/a				2:33:14	19
Nanako Fujii	20 km walk	—N/a				1:31:55	13
Kumiko Okada	20 km walk	—N/a				1:31:57	15

=== Field events ===
==== Men ====
Athlete	Event	Qualification		Final	
Athlete	Event	Distance	Position	Distance	Position
Yuki Hashioka	Long jump	8.17	3 Q	8.10	6
Shotaro Shiroyama	Long jump	7.70	23	Did not advance	
Hibiki Tsuha	Long jump	7.61	26	Did not advance	
Takashi Eto	High jump	2.21	=17	Did not advance	
Naoto Tobe	High jump	2.28	=4 q	2.24	13
Masaki Ejima	Pole vault	5.30	=25	Did not advance	
Seito Yamamoto	Pole vault	5.30	=25	Did not advance	
Takuto Kominami	Javelin throw	78.39	19	Did not advance	

==== Women ====
Athlete	Event	Qualification		Final	
Athlete	Event	Distance	Position	Distance	Position
Haruka Kitaguchi	Javelin throw	62.06	6 q	55.42	12

== Badminton ==
Japan as the host nation, entered thirteen badminton players for each of the following events into the Olympic tournament based on the BWF Race to Tokyo Rankings. The team was announced by the Nippon Badminton Association on 18 June 2021.

=== Men ===
Athlete	Event	Group stage				Elimination	Quarter-finals	Semi-finals	Final / BM	
Athlete	Event	Opposition Score	Opposition Score	Opposition Score	Rank	Opposition Score	Opposition Score	Opposition Score	Opposition Score	Rank
Kento Momota	Singles	Lam (USA); W (21–12, 21–9)	Heo K-h (KOR); L (15–21, 19–21)	—N/a	2	Did not advance				
Kanta Tsuneyama	Singles	Paul (MRI); W (21–8, 21–6)	Coelho (BRA); W (21–14, 21–8)	—N/a	1 Q	Ginting (INA); L (18–21, 14–21)	Did not advance			
Hiroyuki Endo; Yuta Watanabe	Doubles	Olofua / Opeyori (NGR); W (21–2, 21–7)	Ivanov / Sozonov (ROC); W (21–19, 21–19)	Astrup / Rasmussen (DEN); W (21–14, 21–12)	1 Q	—N/a	Lee Y / Wang C-l (TPE); L (16–21, 19–21)	Did not advance		
Takeshi Kamura; Keigo Sonoda	Doubles	Lamsfuß / Seidel (GER); W (21–13, 21–8)	P Chew / R Chew (USA); W (21–11, 21–3)	Li Jh / Liu Yc (CHN); L (14–21, 16–21)	2 Q	—N/a	Ahsan / Setiawan (INA); L (14–21, 21–16, 9–21)	Did not advance		

=== Women ===
Athlete	Event	Group stage				Elimination	Quarterfinals	Semifinals	Final / BM	
Athlete	Event	Opposition Score	Opposition Score	Opposition Score	Rank	Opposition Score	Opposition Score	Opposition Score	Opposition Score	Rank
Akane Yamaguchi	Singles	Shahzad (PAK); W (21–3, 21–8)	Gilmour (GBR); W (21–9, 21–18)	—N/a	1 Q	Kim G-e (KOR); W (21–17, 21–18)	Sindhu (IND); L (13–21, 20–22)	Did not advance		
Nozomi Okuhara	Singles	Li (GER); W (21–17, 21–4)	Kosetskaya (ROC); W (21–6, 21–16)	—N/a	1 Q	Li (CAN); W (21–9, 21–7)	He Bj (CHN); L (21–13, 13–21, 14–21)	Did not advance		
Yuki Fukushima; Sayaka Hirota	Doubles	Birch / Smith (GBR); W (21–13, 21–14)	Chow M K / Lee M Y (MAS); W (17–21, 21–15, 21–8)	Polii / Rahayu (INA); L (22–24, 21–13, 8–21)	2 Q	—N/a	Chen Qc / Jia Yf (CHN); L (21–18, 10–21, 10–21)	Did not advance		
Mayu Matsumoto; Wakana Nagahara	Doubles	Hany / Hosny (EGY); W (21–7, 21–3)	Honderich / Tsai (CAN); W (14–21, 21–19, 21–18)	Piek / Seinen (NED); W (24–22, 21–15)	1 Q	—N/a	Kim S-y / Kong H-y (KOR); L (14–21, 21–14, 26–28)	Did not advance		

=== Mixed ===
Athlete	Event	Group stage				Quarterfinals	Semifinals	Final / BM	
Athlete	Event	Opposition Score	Opposition Score	Opposition Score	Rank=	Opposition Score	Opposition Score	Opposition Score	Rank
Yuta Watanabe; Arisa Higashino	Doubles	Christiansen / Bøje (DEN); W (20–22, 21–11, 21–15)	Leung / Somerville (AUS); W (21–7, 21–15)	Jordan / Oktavianti (INA); W (21–13, 21–10)	1 Q	Puavaranukroh / Taerattanachai (THA); W (15–21, 21–16, 21–14)	Wang / Huang (CHN); L (23–21, 15–21, 14–21)	Tang C M / Tse Y S (HKG); W (21–17, 23–21)	3rd place, bronze medalist(s)

== Baseball ==
Japan national baseball team automatically qualified for the Olympics as the host nation.

Team roster The final roster was announced on 16 June 2021.

Player	No.	Pos.	Birth date (age)	Team	League	Place of birth
Kōyō Aoyagi	12	P	December 11, 1993 (age 32)	(Japan) Hanshin Tigers	(Japan) Nippon Professional Baseball	(Japan) Yokohama, Kanagawa
Suguru Iwazaki	13	P	June 19, 1991 (age 35)	(Japan) Hanshin Tigers	(Japan) Nippon Professional Baseball	(Japan) Shimizu, Shizuoka
Masato Morishita	15	P	August 25, 1997 (age 29)	(Japan) Hiroshima Toyo Carp	(Japan) Nippon Professional Baseball	(Japan) Ōita, Ōita
Hiromi Itoh	16	P	August 31, 1997 (age 29)	(Japan) Hokkaido Nippon-Ham Fighters	(Japan) Nippon Professional Baseball	(Japan) Kayabe, Hokkaido
Yoshinobu Yamamoto	17	P	August 17, 1998 (age 28)	(Japan) Orix Buffaloes	(Japan) Nippon Professional Baseball	(Japan) Bizen, Okayama
Masahiro Tanaka	18	P	November 1, 1988 (age 37)	(Japan) Tohoku Rakuten Golden Eagles	(Japan) Nippon Professional Baseball	(Japan) Itami, Hyōgo
Yasuaki Yamasaki	19	P	October 2, 1992 (age 34)	(Japan) Yokohama DeNA BayStars	(Japan) Nippon Professional Baseball	(Japan) Arakawa, Tokyo
Ryoji Kuribayashi	20	P	July 9, 1996 (age 30)	(Japan) Hiroshima Toyo Carp	(Japan) Nippon Professional Baseball	(Japan) Aisai, Aichi
Yūdai Ōno	22	P	September 26, 1988 (age 38)	(Japan) Chunichi Dragons	(Japan) Nippon Professional Baseball	(Japan) Fushimi-ku, Kyoto
Kodai Senga	41	P	January 30, 1993 (age 33)	(Japan) Fukuoka SoftBank Hawks	(Japan) Nippon Professional Baseball	(Japan) Gamagōri, Aichi
Kaima Taira	61	P	November 15, 1999 (age 26)	(Japan) Saitama Seibu Lions	(Japan) Nippon Professional Baseball	(Japan) Ishigaki, Okinawa
Ryutaro Umeno	7	C	June 17, 1991 (age 35)	(Japan) Hanshin Tigers	(Japan) Nippon Professional Baseball	(Japan) Fukuoka
Takuya Kai	10	C	November 5, 1992 (age 33)	(Japan) Fukuoka SoftBank Hawks	(Japan) Nippon Professional Baseball	(Japan) Ōita, Ōita
Tetsuto Yamada	1	IF	July 16, 1992 (age 34)	(Japan) Tokyo Yakult Swallows	(Japan) Nippon Professional Baseball	(Japan) Toyooka, Hyōgo
Sōsuke Genda	2	IF	February 16, 1993 (age 33)	(Japan) Saitama Seibu Lions	(Japan) Nippon Professional Baseball	(Japan) Ōita, Ōita
Hideto Asamura	3	IF	November 12, 1990 (age 35)	(Japan) Tohoku Rakuten Golden Eagles	(Japan) Nippon Professional Baseball	(Japan) Higashiyodogawa-ku, Osaka
Ryosuke Kikuchi	4	IF	March 11, 1990 (age 36)	(Japan) Hiroshima Toyo Carp	(Japan) Nippon Professional Baseball	(Japan) Higashiyamato, Tokyo
Hayato Sakamoto	6	IF	December 14, 1988 (age 37)	(Japan) Yomiuri Giants	(Japan) Nippon Professional Baseball	(Japan) Itami, Hyōgo
Munetaka Murakami	55	IF	February 2, 2000 (age 26)	(Japan) Tokyo Yakult Swallows	(Japan) Nippon Professional Baseball	(Japan) Kumamoto, Kumamoto
Kensuke Kondoh	8	OF	August 9, 1993 (age 33)	(Japan) Hokkaido Nippon-Ham Fighters	(Japan) Nippon Professional Baseball	(Japan) Midori-ku, Chiba
Yuki Yanagita	9	OF	October 9, 1988 (age 38)	(Japan) Fukuoka SoftBank Hawks	(Japan) Nippon Professional Baseball	(Japan) Hiroshima, Hiroshima
Ryoya Kurihara	31	OF	July 4, 1996 (age 30)	(Japan) Fukuoka SoftBank Hawks	(Japan) Nippon Professional Baseball	(Japan) Fukui, Fukui
Masataka Yoshida	34	OF	July 15, 1993 (age 33)	(Japan) Orix Buffaloes	(Japan) Nippon Professional Baseball	(Japan) Fukui, Fukui
Seiya Suzuki	51	OF	August 18, 1994 (age 32)	(Japan) Hiroshima Toyo Carp	(Japan) Nippon Professional Baseball	(Japan) Arakawa, Tokyo

Group play

Pos	Team	Pld	W	L	RF	RA	RD	PCT	GB	Qualification
1	Japan (H)	2	2	0	11	7	+4	1.000	—	Round 2
2	Dominican Republic	2	1	1	4	4	0	.500	1	Round 1 game #2
3	Mexico	2	0	2	4	8	−4	.000	2	Round 1 game #1

Source: TOCOG and WBSC
(H) Hosts

28 July 12:00 (JST) Fukushima Azuma Baseball Stadium
Team	1	2	3	4	5	6	7	8	9	R	H	E
Dominican Republic	0	0	0	0	0	0	2	0	1	3	8	0
Japan	0	0	0	0	0	0	1	0	3	4	9	0
WP: Ryoji Kuribayashi (1–0) LP: Jairo Asencio (0–1); Boxscore

31 July 12:00 Yokohama Stadium
Team	1	2	3	4	5	6	7	8	9	R	H	E
Japan	0	1	1	3	0	0	1	1	0	7	10	0
Mexico	1	0	0	1	0	0	0	2	0	4	7	2
WP: Masato Morishita (1–0) LP: Juan Pablo Oramas (0–1) Sv: Ryoji Kuribayashi (1); Home runs: JPN: Tetsuto Yamada (1), Hayato Sakamoto (1); MEX: Joey Meneses (1); Boxscore

Round 2

2 August 19:00 Yokohama Stadium
Team	1	2	3	4	5	6	7	8	9	10	R	H	E
United States	0	0	0	3	3	0	0	0	0	0	6	12	2
Japan (10)	0	0	2	1	2	0	0	0	1	1	7	12	0
WP: Ryoji Kuribayashi (2–0) LP: Edwin Jackson (0–1); Home runs: USA: Triston Casas (2); JPN: Seiya Suzuki (1); Boxscore

Semifinal

4 August 19:00 Yokohama Stadium
Team	1	2	3	4	5	6	7	8	9	R	H	E
South Korea	0	0	0	0	0	2	0	0	0	2	7	1
Japan	0	0	1	0	1	0	0	3	X	5	9	1
WP: Hiromi Itoh (1–0) LP: Go Woo-suk (0–1) Sv: Ryoji Kuribayashi (2); Boxscore

Gold medal game

7 August 19:00 Yokohama Stadium
Team	1	2	3	4	5	6	7	8	9	R	H	E
United States	0	0	0	0	0	0	0	0	0	0	6	1
Japan	0	0	1	0	0	0	0	1	X	2	8	0
WP: Masato Morishita (2–0) LP: Nick Martinez (1–1) Sv: Ryoji Kuribayashi (3); Home runs: USA: None; JPN: Munetaka Murakami (1); Boxscore

== Basketball ==
=== Indoor ===
==== Men's tournament ====
Japan men's basketball team automatically qualified for the Olympics as the host nation.

Team roster The roster was announced on 5 July 2021.

Japan national basketball team roster
Players
Coaches

Pos.	No.	Name	Age – Date of birth	Height	Club	Ctr.
PG	2	Yuki Togashi	27 – 30 July 1993	1.67 m (5 ft 6 in)	Chiba Jets Funabashi	(Japan)
SG	6	Makoto Hiejima	31 – 11 April 1990	1.91 m (6 ft 3 in)	Utsunomiya Brex	(Japan)
SF	8	Rui Hachimura	23 – 8 February 1998	2.03 m (6 ft 8 in)	Washington Wizards	(United States)
PG	9	Leo Vendrame	27 – 14 November 1993	1.86 m (6 ft 1 in)	Sun Rockers Shibuya	(Japan)
SF	12	Yuta Watanabe	24 – 13 October 1996	2.06 m (6 ft 9 in)	Toronto Raptors	(Canada)
SG	14	Kosuke Kanamaru	32 – 8 March 1989	1.92 m (6 ft 4 in)	Shimane Susanoo Magic	(Japan)
SF	18	Yudai Baba	25 – 7 November 1995	1.98 m (6 ft 6 in)	Melbourne United	(Australia)
PF	23	Gavin Edwards	33 – 15 January 1988	2.06 m (6 ft 9 in)	Chiba Jets Funabashi	(Japan)
SG	24	Daiki Tanaka	29 – 3 September 1991	1.92 m (6 ft 4 in)	Alvark Tokyo	(Japan)
C	32	Avi Schafer	23 – 28 January 1998	2.06 m (6 ft 9 in)	SeaHorses Mikawa	(Japan)
PF	34	Hugh Watanabe	22 – 23 December 1998	2.07 m (6 ft 9 in)	Ryukyu Golden Kings	(Japan)
SF	88	Tenketsu Harimoto	29 – 8 January 1992	1.98 m (6 ft 6 in)	Nagoya Diamond Dolphins	(Japan)

Head coach

- (Argentina) Julio Lamas

Assistant coach(es)

- (Argentina) Herman Mandole

Legend

- Club – describes last
  club before the tournament
- Age – describes age
  on 25 July 2021

Group play

Pos	Team	Pld	W	L	PF	PA	PD	Pts	Qualification
1	Slovenia	3	3	0	329	268	+61	6	Quarterfinals
2	Spain	3	2	1	256	243	+13	5	Quarterfinals
3	Argentina	3	1	2	268	276	−8	4	Quarterfinals
4	Japan (H)	3	0	3	235	301	−66	3	

Source: TOCOG and FIBA
Rules for classification: 1) classification points; 2) head-to-head results; 3) head-to-head game points difference; 4) head-to-head number of game points scored.
(H) Hosts

26 July 2021
21:00
v

Boxscore

Japan	77–88	Spain
Scoring by quarter: 14–18, 14–30, 28–21, 21–19
Pts: Hachimura 20; Rebs: Watanabe 8 Asts: Baba, Tanaka 5		Pts: Rubio 20; Rebs: Claver 9 Asts: Rubio 9

Saitama Super Arena, Saitama
Referees: Aleksandar Glišić (SRB), Mārtiņš Kozlovskis (LAT), Rabah Noujaim (LIB)

29 July 2021
13:40
v

Boxscore

Slovenia	116–81	Japan
Scoring by quarter: 29–23, 24–18, 27–23, 36–17
Pts: Dončić 25; Rebs: Tobey 11; Asts: Dončić 7		Pts: Hachimura 34; Rebs: Hachimura, Watanabe 7 Asts: Hachimura, Tanaka 3

Saitama Super Arena, Saitama
Referees: Aleksandar Glišić (SRB), Michael Weiland (CAN), Ferdinand Pascual (PHI)

1 August 2021
13:40
v

Boxscore

Argentina	97–77	Japan
Scoring by quarter: 26–16, 20–22, 19–15, 32–24
Pts: Scola 23; Rebs: Scola 10; Asts: Campazzo 11		Pts: Baba 18; Rebs: Hachimura 11; Asts: three players 3

Saitama Super Arena, Saitama
Referees: Roberto Vázquez (PUR), Mārtiņš Kozlovskis (LAT), Michael Weiland (CAN)

==== Women's tournament ====
Japan women's basketball team automatically qualified for the Olympics as the host nation.

Team roster The roster was announced on 1 July 2021.

Japan women's national basketball team – 2020 Summer Olympics roster
Players
Coaches

Pos.	No.	Name	Age – Date of birth	Height	Club
PF	0	Moeko Nagaoka	27 – 29 December 1993	1.83 m (6 ft 0 in)	Toyota Antelopes	(Japan)
C	8	Maki Takada	31 – 23 August 1989	1.85 m (6 ft 1 in)	Denso Iris	(Japan)
SG	12	Naho Miyoshi	27 – 21 December 1993	1.67 m (5 ft 6 in)	Toyota Antelopes	(Japan)
PG	13	Rui Machida	28 – 8 March 1993	1.62 m (5 ft 4 in)	Fujitsu Red Wave	(Japan)
PG	15	Nako Motohashi	27 – 10 October 1993	1.65 m (5 ft 5 in)	Haneda Vickies	(Japan)
SG	20	Nanako Todo	20 – 29 November 2000	1.74 m (5 ft 9 in)	Toyota Boshoku Sunshine Rabbits	(Japan)
SG	27	Saki Hayashi	26 – 16 March 1995	1.73 m (5 ft 8 in)	JX-Eneos Sunflowers	(Japan)
PF	30	Evelyn Mawuli	26 – 2 June 1995	1.81 m (5 ft 11 in)	Toyota Antelopes	(Japan)
PG	32	Saori Miyazaki	25 – 27 August 1995	1.67 m (5 ft 6 in)	JX-Eneos Sunflowers	(Japan)
PF	52	Yuki Miyazawa	28 – 2 June 1993	1.83 m (6 ft 0 in)	Fujitsu Red Wave	(Japan)
SF	88	Himawari Akaho	22 – 28 August 1998	1.85 m (6 ft 1 in)	Denso Iris	(Japan)
PF	99	Monica Okoye	22 – 7 February 1999	1.82 m (6 ft 0 in)	Fujitsu Red Wave	(Japan)

Head coach

- (United States) Tom Hovasse

Assistant coach(es)

- (Japan) Toru Ontsuka

Legend

- Club – describes last
  club before the tournament
- Age – describes age
  on 26 July 2021

Group play

Pos	Team	Pld	W	L	PF	PA	PD	Pts	Qualification
1	United States	3	3	0	260	223	+37	6	Quarterfinals
2	Japan (H)	3	2	1	245	239	+6	5	Quarterfinals
3	France	3	1	2	239	229	+10	4	Quarterfinals
4	Nigeria	3	0	3	217	270	−53	3	

Source: TOCOG and FIBA
Rules for classification: 1) classification points; 2) head-to-head results; 3) head-to-head game points difference; 4) head-to-head number of game points scored.
(H) Hosts

27 July 2021
10:00
v

Boxscore

Japan	74–70	France
Scoring by quarter: 13–17, 21–19, 18–13, 22–21
Pts: Hayashi 12; Rebs: Akaho 9 Asts: Machida 11		Pts: Gruda 18; Rebs: Gruda 9 Asts: Johannès 4

Saitama Super Arena, Saitama
Referees: Maripier Malo (CAN), James Boyer (AUS), Yevgeniy Mikheyev (KAZ)

30 July 2021
13:40
v

Boxscore

United States	86–69	Japan
Scoring by quarter: 28–30, 21–10, 16–13, 21–16
Pts: Wilson 20; Rebs: Stewart 13; Asts: Bird, Stewart 6		Pts: Takada 15; Rebs: Akaho 8 Asts: Machida 11

Saitama Super Arena, Saitama
Referees: Yener Yılmaz (TUR), Yevgeniy Mikheyev (KAZ), Gizella Györgyi (NOR)

2 August 2021
10:00
v

Boxscore

Nigeria	83–102	Japan
Scoring by quarter: 22–30, 16–21, 19–33, 26–18
Pts: Macaulay 18; Rebs: Chidom, Elonu 7 Asts: Nyingifa 8		Pts: Hayashi 23; Rebs: Akaho 7 Asts: Machida 15

Saitama Super Arena, Saitama
Referees: Juan Fernández (ARG), Andreia Silva (BRA), Yevgeniy Mikheyev (KAZ)

Quarterfinal

4 August 2021
17:20
v

Boxscore

Japan	86–85	Belgium
Scoring by quarter: 19–16, 22–26, 20–26, 25–17
Pts: Miyazawa 21; Rebs: Akaho 7 Asts: Machida 14		Pts: Meesseman 25; Rebs: Meesseman 11; Asts: Allemand 8

Saitama Super Arena, Saitama
Referees: Yu Jung (TPE), Amy Bonner (USA), James Boyer (AUS)

Semifinal

6 August 2021
20:00
v

Boxscore

Japan	87–71	France
Scoring by quarter: 14–22, 27–12, 27–16, 19–21
Pts: Akaho 17; Rebs: Akaho, Miyazawa 7 Asts: Machida 18		Pts: Gruda 18; Rebs: Williams 8 Asts: Williams 7

Saitama Super Arena, Saitama
Referees: Maripier Malo (CAN), Luis Castillo (ESP), Yevgeniy Mikheyev (KAZ)

Final

8 August 2021
11:30
v

Boxscore

United States	90–75	Japan
Scoring by quarter: 23–14, 27–25, 25–17, 15–19
Pts: Griner 30; Rebs: Stewart 14; Asts: Taurasi 8		Pts: Takada 17; Rebs: Okoye 8 Asts: Machida 6

Saitama Super Arena, Saitama
Referees: Manuel Mazzoni (ITA), Andreia Silva (BRA), Maripier Malo (CAN)

=== 3×3 basketball ===
Summary

Team	Event	Group stage								Quarter-finals	Semi-finals	GM / BM	Rank
Team	Event	Opposition Score	Opposition Score	Opposition Score	Opposition Score	Opposition Score	Opposition Score	Opposition Score	Rank	Opposition Score	Opposition Score	Opposition Score	Rank
Japan men's 3×3	Men's 3×3 tournament	Poland; L 19–20	Belgium; W 18–16	Netherlands; L 20–21	Latvia; L 18–21	Serbia; L 11–21	ROC; L 16–19	China; W 21–16	6	Latvia; L 18–21	Did not advance		6
Japan women's 3×3	Women's 3×3 tournament	ROC; L18–21	Romania; W 20–8	Mongolia; W 19–10	France; W 19–15	China; L 12–15	Italy; W 22–10	United States; W 20–18	4	France; L 14–16	Did not advance		5

==== Men's tournament ====
Japan men's basketball 3x3 team automatically qualified for the Olympics as the host nation.

Team roster The players were announced on 3 July 2021.

- Ira Brown
- Tomoya Ochiai
- Keisei Tominaga
- Ryuto Yasuoka

Group play

Pos	Team	Pld	W	L	PF	PA	PD	Qualification
1	Serbia	7	7	0	138	91	+47	Semifinals
2	Belgium	7	4 (Note: Belgium 2–0, Latvia 1–1, Netherlands 0–2)	3	126	127	−1	Semifinals
3	Latvia	7	4	3	133	129	+4	Quarterfinals
4	Netherlands	7	4	3	132	129	+3	Quarterfinals
5	ROC	7	3	4	116	125	−9	Quarterfinals
6	Japan (H)	7	2 (Note: Japan 1–1, 123 PS; Poland 1–1, 120 PS; China 1–1, 119 PS)	5	123	134	−11	Quarterfinals
7	Poland	7	2	5	120	130	−10	
8	China	7	2	5	119	142	−23	

Source: TOCOG and FIBA
Rules for classification: 1) Wins; 2) Head-to-head record; 3) Points scored.
(H) Hosts
Notes:

24 July 2021
19:05
v

Report

Japan	19–20 (OT)	Poland
Pts: Brown, Tominaga 7		Pts: Pawłowski, Zamojski 7

Aomi Urban Sports Park, Tokyo
Referees: Vlad Ghizdareanu (ROU), Jasmina Juras (SRB)

24 July 2021
22:25
v

Report

Belgium	16–18 (OT)	Japan
Pts: Bogaerts 5		Pts: Yasuoka 7

Aomi Urban Sports Park, Tokyo
Referees: Vlad Ghizdareanu (ROU), Su Yu-yen (TPE)

25 July 2021
19:05
v

Report

Japan	20–21	Netherlands
Pts: Tominaga 10		Pts: Bekkering, Slagter 6

Aomi Urban Sports Park, Tokyo
Referees: Marek Maliszewski (POL), Vanessa Devlin (AUS)

25 July 2021
22:25
v

Report

Latvia	21–18	Japan
Pts: Lasmanis 7		Pts: Tominaga 9

Aomi Urban Sports Park, Tokyo
Referees: Edmond Ho (HKG), Marek Maliszewski (POL)

26 July 2021
12:00
v

Report

Serbia	21–11	Japan
Pts: Domović Bulut 7		Pts: Yasuoka 8

Aomi Urban Sports Park, Tokyo
Referees: Edmond Ho (HKG), Glenn Tuitt (USA)

26 July 2021
15:00
v

Report

Japan	16–19	ROC
Pts: Brown 7		Pts: Pisklov 7

Aomi Urban Sports Park, Tokyo
Referees: Glenn Tuitt (USA), Cecília Tóth (HUN)

27 July 2021
15:05
v

Report

China	16–21	Japan
Pts: Gao 8		Pts: Tominaga, Yasuoka 8

Aomi Urban Sports Park, Tokyo
Referees: Markos Michaelides (SUI), Jasmina Juras (SRB)

Quarter-finals

27 July 2021
22:20
v

Report

Latvia	21–18	Japan
Pts: Krūmiņš 9		Pts: Tominaga 8

Aomi Urban Sports Park, Tokyo
Referees: Jasmina Juras (SRB), Marek Maliszewski (POL)

==== Women's tournament ====
Japan women's national 3x3 team qualified for the Olympics by securing a top three finish at the 2021 Olympic Qualifying Tournament.

Team roster The players were announced on 3 July 2021.

- Stephanie Mawuli
- Risa Nishioka
- Mio Shinozaki
- Mai Yamamoto

Group play

Pos	Team	Pld	W	L	PF	PA	PD	Qualification
1	United States	7	6	1	136	98	+38	Semifinals
2	ROC	7	5 (Note: ROC 2–0, China 1–1, Japan 0–2)	2	129	90	+39	Semifinals
3	China	7	5	2	127	97	+30	Quarterfinals
4	Japan (H)	7	5	2	130	97	+33	Quarterfinals
5	France	7	4	3	118	116	+2	Quarterfinals
6	Italy	7	2	5	98	125	−27	Quarterfinals
7	Romania	7	1	6	89	142	−53	
8	Mongolia	7	0	7	79	141	−62	

Source: TOCOG and FIBA
Rules for classification: 1) Wins; 2) Head-to-head record; 3) Points scored.
(H) Hosts
Notes:

24 July 2021
10:15
v

Report

ROC	21–18	Japan
Pts: O. Frolkina 7		Pts: Shinozaki 8

Aomi Urban Sports Park, Tokyo
Referees: Edmond Ho (HKG), Cecília Tóth (HUN)

24 July 2021
14:25
v

Report

Romania	8–20	Japan
Pts: Ursu-Kim 3		Pts: Mawuli 9

Aomi Urban Sports Park, Tokyo
Referees: Sara El-Sharnouby (EGY), Markos Michaelides (SUI)

25 July 2021
10:15
v

Report

Japan	19–10	Mongolia
Pts: Mawuli, Yamamoto 6		Pts: Chimeddolgor, Solongo 3

Aomi Urban Sports Park, Tokyo
Referees: Shi Qirong (CHN), Markos Michaelides (SUI)

25 July 2021
17:55
v

Report

Japan	19–15	France
Pts: three players 5		Pts: Paget 6

Aomi Urban Sports Park, Tokyo
Referees: Evgeny Ostrovskiy (RUS), Vanessa Devlin (AUS)

26 July 2021
10:15
v

Report

Japan	12–15	China
Pts: Mawuli 5		Pts: Wang L. 5

Aomi Urban Sports Park, Tokyo
Referees: Marek Maliszewski (POL), Vanessa Devlin (AUS)

26 July 2021
14:25
v

Report

Italy	10–22	Japan
Pts: Consolini 4		Pts: Mawuli 8

Aomi Urban Sports Park, Tokyo
Referees: Cecília Tóth (HUN), Su Yu-yen (TPE)

27 July 2021
13:30
v

Report

United States	18–20	Japan
Pts: Dolson 7		Pts: Yamamoto 8

Aomi Urban Sports Park, Tokyo
Referees: Evgeny Ostrovskiy (RUS), Shi Qirong (CHN)

Quarterfinal

27 July 2021
21:50
v

Report

Japan	14–16	France
Pts: Shinozaki 7		Pts: Paget 5

Aomi Urban Sports Park, Tokyo
Referees: Evgeny Ostrovskiy (RUS), Cecília Tóth (HUN)

== Boxing ==
Japan entered six boxers (four men and two women) into the Olympic tournament. Sewon Okazawa (men's welterweight), 2018 world bronze medalist Tsukimi Namiki (women's flyweight), and Sena Irie (women's featherweight) secured the spots on the host nation's squad in their respective weight divisions, either by advancing to the semifinal match or by scoring a box-off triumph, at the 2020 Asia & Oceania Qualification Tournament in Amman, Jordan. Three more boxers were officially selected by the Japanese Olympic Committee and the Japanese Boxing Federation to take up the host nation places for the Games, including Rio 2016 Olympian Daisuke Narimatsu in the men's lightweight division.

Athlete	Event	Round of 32	Round of 16	Quarterfinals	Semifinals	Final	
Athlete	Event	Opposition Result	Opposition Result	Opposition Result	Opposition Result	Opposition Result	Rank
Ryomei Tanaka	Men's flyweight	Finol (VEN); W 5–0	Hu Jg (CHN); W 3–1	Martinez (COL); W 4–1	Paalam (PHI); L 0–5	Did not advance	3rd place, bronze medalist(s)
Daisuke Narimatsu	Men's lightweight	Pezo (PER); W 5–0	Safiullin (KAZ); L WO	Did not advance			
Sewon Okazawa	Men's welterweight	Yadav (IND); W 5–0	Iglesias (CUB); L 2–3	Did not advance			
Yuito Moriwaki	Men's middleweight	Mousavi (IRI); W 3–2	Khyzhniak (UKR); L 0–5	Did not advance			
Tsukimi Namiki	Women's flyweight	Nanziri (UGA); W 5–0	Sousa (BRA); W 5–0	Valencia (COL); W 5–0	Krasteva (BUL); L 0–5	Did not advance	3rd place, bronze medalist(s)
Sena Irie	Women's featherweight	Solorzano (ESA); W 5–0	Hlimi (TUN); W 5–0	Nechita (ROU); W 3–2	Artingstall (GBR); W 3–2	Petecio (PHI); W 5–0	1st place, gold medalist(s)

== Canoeing ==
=== Slalom ===
Being the host nation, Japan has been awarded one boat each in all four classes. On October 20, 2019, the slalom canoeists were officially selected to the host nation's roster at the conclusion of the NHK Slalom International Cup, with Rio 2016 bronze medalist Takuya Haneda remarkably going to his fourth straight Olympics.

Athlete	Event	Preliminary						Semifinals		Final	
Athlete	Event	Run 1	Rank	Run 2	Rank	Best	Rank	Time	Rank	Time	Rank
Takuya Haneda	Men's C-1	106.57	11	105.15	11	105.15	13 Q	107.82	10 Q	109.30	10
Kazuya Adachi	Men's K-1	97.72	14	92.09	6	92.09	6 Q	101.60	16	Did not advance	
Ayano Sato	Women's C-1	161.77	21	151.03	19	151.03	20	Did not advance			
Aki Yazawa	Women's K-1	129.87	21	127.91	21	127.91	22 Q	124.73	19	Did not advance	

=== Sprint ===
Being the host nation, Japan has been awarded a minimum of three boats, with one each in the men's C-1 1000 m, women's C-1 200 m, and women's K-1 500 m. The men's K-4 500 m boat was added to the team roster with a top-ten finish at the 2019 ICF Canoe Sprint World Championships in Szeged, Hungary and the women's K-1 200 m with the fastest finish vying for qualification at the 2021 Asian Championships in Pattaya, Thailand. With the cancellation of the 2021 Pan American Championships and the lack of eligible competitors available from the Americas in the canoe sprint regatta, the women's C-2 500 m crew accepted a spare berth from the International Canoe Federation for the Japanese team.

Athlete	Event	Heats		Quarterfinals		Semifinals		Final	
Athlete	Event	Time	Rank	Time	Rank	Time	Rank	Time	Rank
Takanori Tōme	Men's C-1 1000 m	4:37.208	7 QF	4:38.546	6	Did not advance			
Hiroki Fujishima; Yūsuke Miyata; Momotaro Matsushita; Keiji Mizumoto	Men's K-4 500 m	1:32.295	6 QF	1:28.211	7	Did not advance			
Manaka Kubota	C-1 200 metres	50.608	7 QF	49.769	6	Did not advance			
Teruko Kiriake; Manaka Kubota	Women's C-2 500 m	2:16.791	7 QF	2:08.849	5 FB	Bye		2:06.196	14
Yuka Ono	Women's K-1 200 m	45.251	7 QF	45.610	7	Did not advance			

Qualification Legend: FA = Qualify to final (medal); FB = Qualify to final B (non-medal)

== Cycling ==
=== Road ===
Japan entered a squad of four riders (two per gender) to compete in their respective Olympic road races. Two of them filled out the places reserved for the host nation, while the remaining male and female rider earned a slot each by finishing in the top 50 (for men) and top 22 (for women) in the UCI World Ranking.

Athlete	Event	Time	Rank
Yukiya Arashiro	Men's road race	6:15:38	35
Nariyuki Masuda	Men's road race	6:25:16	84
Hiromi Kaneko	Women's road race	4:01:08	43
Eri Yonamine	Women's road race	3:55:13	21
Eri Yonamine	Women's time trial	34:34.97	22

=== Track ===
Following the completion of the 2020 UCI Track Cycling World Championships, Japanese riders accumulated spots for both men and women in the sprint, keirin, and omnium, as well as the women's madison, based on their country's results in the final UCI Olympic rankings.

Topping the podium in the women's omnium at the 2020 Worlds, Yumi Kajihara became the first Japanese rider to guarantee a spot on the host nation's track cycling team for the Games. Five more members on the squad were named on June 4, 2020, with sprint riders Yudai Nitta (London 2012) and Yuta Wakimoto (Rio 2016) booking their spots for the second Olympics.

Sprint

Athlete	Event	Qualification		Round 1	Repechage 1	Round 2	Repechage 2	Round 3	Repechage 3	Quarterfinals	Semifinals	Final	
Athlete	Event	Time Speed (km/h)	Rank	Opposition Time Speed (km/h)	Opposition Time Speed (km/h)	Opposition Time Speed (km/h)	Opposition Time Speed (km/h)	Opposition Time Speed (km/h)	Opposition Time Speed (km/h)	Opposition Time Speed (km/h)	Opposition Time Speed (km/h)	Opposition Time Speed (km/h)	Rank
Yudai Nitta	Men's sprint	9.728; 74.013	26	Did not advance									
Yuta Wakimoto	Men's sprint	9.518; 75.646	9 Q	Quintero (COL); W 9.997; 72.022	Bye	Kenny (GBR); L	Bötticher (GER); W 10.323; 69.747	Paul (TTO); L	Kenny (GBR); Awang (MAS); L	Did not advance			
Yuka Kobayashi	Women's sprint	10.711; 67.221	17 Q	Marchant (GBR); L	Krupeckaitė (LTU); Marozaitė (LTU); W 11.335; 63.520	Gros (FRA); L	Voynova (ROC); L	Did not advance					

Keirin

Athlete	Event	Round 1	Repechage	Quarterfinals	Semifinals	Final
Athlete	Event	Rank	Rank	Rank	Rank	Rank
Yudai Nitta	Men's keirin	1 QF	Bye	6	Did not advance	
Yuta Wakimoto	Men's keirin	1 QF	Bye	1 SF	5 FB	7
Yuka Kobayashi	Women's keirin	2 QF	Bye	6	Did not advance	

Omnium

Athlete	Event	Scratch race		Tempo race		Elimination race		Points race		Total points	Rank
Athlete	Event	Rank	Points	Rank	Points	Rank	Points	Rank	Points	Total points	Rank
Eiya Hashimoto	Men's omnium	8	26	16	10	12	18	15	0	54	15
Yumi Kajihara	Women's omnium	2	38	5	32	2	38	11	2	110	2nd place, silver medalist(s)

Madison

Athlete	Event	Points	Laps	Rank
Yumi Kajihara; Kisato Nakamura	Women's madison	0	–40	13

=== Mountain biking ===
As the host nation, Japanese mountain bikers have already received a quota place each per gender at their disposal for the Games. The mountain biking team was officially named to the host nation's roster on June 5, 2020, with Kohei Yamamoto booking his fourth consecutive trip to the Games on the men's side.

Athlete	Event	Time	Rank
Kohei Yamamoto	Men's cross-country	1:32:35	29
Miho Imai	Women's cross-country	LAP (3 laps)	37

=== BMX ===
As the host nation, Japan has already received four quota places each per gender per event at their disposal for the Games.

Race

Athlete	Event	Quarterfinals		Semifinals		Final	
Athlete	Event	Points	Rank	Points	Rank	Result	Rank
Yoshitaku Nagasako	Men's race	12	5	Did not advance			
Sae Hatakeyama	Women's race	22	6	Did not advance			

Freestyle

Athlete	Event	Seeding		Final	
Athlete	Event	Score	Rank	Score	Rank
Rim Nakamura	Men's freestyle	87.67	2	85.10	5
Minato Oike	Women's freestyle	61.45	8	75.40	7

== Diving ==
Japan, as the host nation, is automatically entitled to places in all synchronized diving events, but athletes for individual events must qualify through their own performances at 2019 FINA World Championships, the 2019 Asian Cup, and the 2020 FINA World Cup series.

Five-time Olympian Ken Terauchi and his Rio 2016 partner Sho Sakai became the first Japanese divers to be selected to the squad after finishing seventh in the men's synchronized springboard at the 2019 FINA World Championships in Gwangju, South Korea.

=== Men ===
Athlete	Event	Preliminary		Semifinal		Final	
Athlete	Event	Points	Rank	Points	Rank	Points	Rank
Ken Terauchi	3 m springboard	430.20	10 Q	424.50	7 Q	359.70	12
Reo Nishida	10 m platform	314.30	25	Did not advance			
Rikuto Tamai	10 m platform	374.25	16 Q	413.65	8 Q	431.95	7
Sho Sakai; Ken Terauchi	3 m synchronized springboard	—N/a				393.93	5
Hiroki Ito; Kazuki Murakami	10 m synchronized platform	—N/a				377.10	8

=== Women ===
Athlete	Event	Preliminary		Semifinal		Final	
Athlete	Event	Points	Rank	Points	Rank	Points	Rank
Haruka Enomoto	3 m springboard	277.85	17 Q	255.40	17	Did not advance	
Sayaka Mikami	3 m springboard	317.10	5 Q	273.70	16	Did not advance	
Matsuri Arai	10 m platform	268.80	22	Did not advance			
Haruka Enomoto; Hazuki Miyamoto	3 m synchronized springboard	—N/a				269.40	5
Matsuri Arai; Minami Itahashi	10 m synchronized platform	—N/a				291.42	6

== Equestrian ==
Japan, as the host nation, automatically received a team of three riders in each of the three sporting disciplines: dressage, eventing, and jumping.

=== Dressage ===
Masanao Takahashi and Rubicon have been named the traveling alternates.

Athlete	Horse	Event	Grand Prix		Grand Prix Special		Grand Prix Freestyle		Overall	
Athlete	Horse	Event	Score	Rank	Score	Rank	Technical	Artistic	Score	Rank
Shingo Hayashi	Scolari	Individual	65.714	48	—N/a		Did not advance			
Hiroyuki Kitahara	Huracan	Individual	66.304	45	—N/a		Did not advance			
Kazuki Sado	Ludwig der Sonnenkönig	Individual	62.531	56	—N/a		Did not advance			
Shingo Hayashi; Hiroyuki Kitahara; Kazuki Sado	See above	Team	6264.5	14	Did not advance		—N/a		Did not advance	

Qualification Legend: Q = Qualified for the final; q = Qualified for the final as a lucky loser

=== Eventing ===
Ryuzo Kitajima and Feroza Nieuwmoed have been named the reserves.

Athlete	Horse	Event	Dressage		Cross-country			Jumping						Total	
Athlete	Horse	Event	Dressage		Cross-country			Qualifier			Final			Total	
Athlete	Horse	Event	Penalties	Rank	Penalties	Total	Rank	Penalties	Total	Rank	Penalties	Total	Rank	Penalties	Rank
Yoshiaki Oiwa	Calle	Individual	31.50	21	Eliminated			Did not advance							
Toshiyuki Tanaka	Talma d'Allou	Individual	32.70	29	30.80	63.50	35	12.00	75.50	34	Did not advance				
Kazuma Tomoto	Vinci de la Vigne	Individual	26.10	7	1.60	27.50	5	4.00	31.50	7	0.40	31.90	4	31.90	4
Yoshiaki Oiwa; Toshiyuki Tanaka; Kazuma Tomoto; Ryuzo Kitajima (s)	Calle; Talma d'Allou; Vinci de la Vigne; Feroza Nieuwmoed	Team	90.10	4	232.40	322.50	12	16.00+20.00	358.50	11	—N/a			358.50	11

- (s) – substituted before jumping – 20 replacement penalties

=== Jumping ===
Mike Kawai and As de Mai were named the traveling alternates.

Athlete	Horse	Event	Qualification		Final			Jump-off		
Athlete	Horse	Event	Penalties	Rank	Penalties	Time	Rank	Penalties	Time	Rank
Daisuke Fukushima	Canyon	Individual	0	=1 Q	0	87.57	=1 Q	0	43.76	6
Koki Saito	Chilensky	Individual	0	=1 Q	5	89.82	13	Did not advance		
Eiken Sato	Saphyr des Lacs	Individual	1	=26 Q	16	84.67	25	Did not advance		
Daisuke Fukushima; Koki Saito; Eiken Sato	See above	Team	Eliminated		Did not advance					

== Fencing ==
Japanese fencers qualified a full squad in the women's team foil for the Games as the highest-ranked nation from Asia and Oceania outside the world's top four in the FIE Olympic Team Rankings. Rookies Masaru Yamada (men's épée), Takahiro Shikine (men's foil), Kento Yoshida (men's sabre), and Misaki Emura (women's sabre), with Nozomi Satō (women's épée) going to her third consecutive Games, secured additional places on the host nation's roster as one of the two highest-ranked fencers each vying for qualification from Asia and Oceania in the FIE Adjusted Official Rankings.

Eight more fencers were officially named to the host nation's roster on April 25, 2021, including Rio 2016 Olympians Kazuyasu Minobe (men's épée) and Chika Aoki (women's sabre) and American-born Kaito Streets (men's sabre).

=== Men ===
Athlete	Event	Round of 64	Round of 32	Round of 16	Quarterfinals	Semifinals	Final / BM	
Athlete	Event	Opposition Score	Opposition Score	Opposition Score	Opposition Score	Opposition Score	Opposition Score	Rank
Koki Kano	Épée	Bye	E Garozzo (ITA); W 15–12	Bida (ROC); L 12–15	Did not advance			
Kazuyasu Minobe	Épée	Bye	Jurka (CZE); W 15–14	Park S-y (KOR); L 6–15	Did not advance			
Masaru Yamada	Épée	Bye	Petrov (KGZ); W 15–13	Kurbanov (KAZ); W 15–8	Santarelli (ITA); L 13–15	Did not advance		
Koki Kano; Kazuyasu Minobe; Satoru Uyama; Masaru Yamada	Team épée	—N/a		United States; W 45–39	France; W 45–44	South Korea; W 45–38	ROC; W 45–36	1st place, gold medalist(s)
Kyosuke Matsuyama	Foil	Bye	Pauty (FRA); W 15–7	D Garozzo (ITA); L 14–15	Did not advance			
Toshiya Saito	Foil	Bye	Toldo (BRA); W 15–10	Lefort (FRA); L 4–15	Did not advance			
Takahiro Shikine	Foil	Bye	Samandi (TUN); W 15–4	Choi (HKG); W 15–6	Abouelkassem (EGY); W 15–13	D Garozzo (ITA); L 9–15	Choupenitch (CZE); L 8–15	4
Kyosuke Matsuyama; Yudai Nagano; Toshiya Saito; Takahiro Shikine	Team foil	—N/a		Bye	Italy; W 45–43	France; L 42–45	United States; L 31–45	4
Tomohiro Shimamura	Sabre	Mackiewicz (USA); L 13–15	Did not advance					
Kaito Streets	Sabre	Bounabi (ALG); W 15–9	Dershwitz (USA); L 9–15	Did not advance				
Kento Yoshida	Sabre	Quintero (VEN); L 13–15	Did not advance					
Tomohiro Shimamura; Kaito Streets; Kenta Tokunan; Kento Yoshida	Team sabre	—N/a		Egypt; L 42–45	Did not advance			

=== Women ===
Athlete	Event	Round of 64	Round of 32	Round of 16	Quarterfinals	Semifinals	Final / BM	
Athlete	Event	Opposition Score	Opposition Score	Opposition Score	Opposition Score	Opposition Score	Opposition Score	Rank
Nozomi Satō	Épée	Bye	Kang Y-m (KOR); W 15–14	Beljajeva (EST); L 10–15	Did not advance			
Rio Azuma	Foil	Bye	Jeon H-s (KOR); L 10–11	Did not advance				
Sera Azuma	Foil	Bye	Ryan (CAN); L 11–12	Did not advance				
Yuka Ueno	Foil	Bye	Mohamed (EGY); W 15–5	Ross (USA); W 15–9	Kiefer (USA); L 11–15	Did not advance		
Rio Azuma; Sera Azuma; Sumire Tsuji; Yuka Ueno	Team foil	—N/a			United States; L 36–45	Classification semifinal Egypt; W 45–27	Fifth place match Canada; L 31–45	6
Chika Aoki	Sabre	Dayibekova (UZB); L 9–15	Did not advance					
Misaki Emura	Sabre	Bye	Gkountoura (GRE); W 15–8	Brunet (FRA); L 12–15	Did not advance			
Norika Tamura	Sabre	Bye	Qian Jr (CHN); L 8–15	Did not advance				
Chika Aoki; Misaki Emura; Shihomi Fukushima; Norika Tamura	Team sabre	—N/a		Tunisia; W 45–29	ROC; L 34–45	Classification semifinal Hungary; W 45–42	Fifth place match United States; W 45–43	5

== Field hockey ==
Summary

Key:

- FT – After full time.
- P – Match decided by penalty-shootout.

Team	Event	Group stage						Quarter-finals	Semi-finals	GM / BM	
Team	Event	Opposition Score	Opposition Score	Opposition Score	Opposition Score	Opposition Score	Rank	Opposition Score	Opposition Score	Opposition Score	Rank
Japan men's	Men's tournament	Australia; L 3–5	Argentina; L 1–2	New Zealand; D 2–2	Spain; L 1–4	India; L 3–5	6	did not advance			11
Japan women's	Women's tournament	China; L 3–4	New Zealand; L 1–2	Australia; L 0–1	Argentina; L 1–2	Spain; L 1–4	6	did not advance			11

=== Men's tournament ===
As the host nation, Japan men's field hockey team qualified for the Olympics by virtue of obtaining a world ranking equal to or better than thirtieth place by the end of 2018, or not finish lower than sixth at the 2018 Asian Games.

Team roster The squad was announced on 8 June 2021.

Head coach: (Netherlands) Siegfried Aikman

No.	Pos.	Player	Date of birth (age)	Caps	Goals	Club
1	FW	Koji Yamasaki	27 February 1996 (aged 25)	97	28	(Japan) Gifu Asahi Club
4	MF	Genki Mitani	12 June 1990 (aged 31)	168	6	(Japan) Vercosta Fukui
5	MF	Seren Tanaka	9 November 1992 (aged 28)	103	8	(Japan) Gifu Asahi Club
6	MF	Hiromasa Ochiai	9 February 1994 (aged 27)	75	5	(Japan) Tochigi Liebe
7	FW	Kazuma Murata	28 November 1991 (aged 29)	120	33	(Japan) Tochigi Liebe
9	FW	Kenta Tanaka	4 May 1988 (aged 33)	154	80	(Netherlands) HGC
11	FW	Kenji Kitazato	19 May 1989 (aged 32)	162	50	(Japan) Alder Hanno
12	MF	Yuma Nagai	18 March 1996 (aged 25)	11	0	(Japan) Gifu Asahi Club
13	DF	Manabu Yamashita (Captain)	4 February 1989 (aged 32)	186	1	(Japan) Oyabe Redox
14	MF	Kaito Tanaka	1 November 1995 (aged 25)	45	5	(Japan) Indicator Light Fullertel
15	MF	Ken Nagayoshi	26 October 1999 (aged 21)	12	0	(Japan) Tenri University Bears
17	FW	Kentaro Fukuda	27 July 1995 (aged 25)	69	15	(Japan) Gifu Asahi Club
20	DF	Masaki Ohashi	8 May 1993 (aged 28)	94	0	(Japan) Tochigi Liebe
25	DF	Shota Yamada	21 December 1994 (aged 26)	102	32	(Japan) Gifu Asahi Club
29	DF	Hirotaka Zendana	14 February 1993 (aged 28)	119	30	(Japan) Tenri University Bears
30	GK	Takashi Yoshikawa	29 November 1994 (aged 26)	94	0	(Japan) Gifu Asahi Club
31	FW	Kota Watanabe	30 October 1996 (aged 24)	74	8	(Japan) Vercosta Fukui
32	DF	Yoshiki Kirishita	27 December 1998 (aged 22)	55	4	(Japan) Tochigi Liebe

Group play

Pos	Team	Pld	W	D	L	GF	GA	GD	Pts	Qualification
1	Australia	5	4	1	0	22	9	+13	13	Quarter-finals
2	India	5	4	0	1	15	13	+2	12	Quarter-finals
3	Argentina	5	2	1	2	10	11	−1	7	Quarter-finals
4	Spain	5	1	2	2	9	10	−1	5	Quarter-finals
5	New Zealand	5	1	1	3	11	16	−5	4	
6	Japan (H)	5	0	1	4	10	18	−8	1	

Source: Tokyo 2020 and FIH
Rules for classification: 1) points; 2) matches won; 3) goal difference; 4) goals for; 5) head-to-head result; 6) field goals scored.
(H) Hosts

24 July 2021
09:30
v

Japan	3–5	Australia
Ke. Tanaka 22', 27'; Kirishita 26'	Report	Brand 11'; Craig 14'; Govers 31'; Zalewski 38'; Beale 50'

North Pitch
Umpires:
Jakub Mejzlík (CZE)
Lim Hong-Zhen (SGP)

25 July 2021
19:00
v

Japan	1–2	Argentina
Ke. Tanaka 60'	Report	Tolini 5'; Keenan 19'

South Pitch
Umpires:
Raghu Prasad (IND)
Peter Wright (RSA)

27 July 2021
11:45
v

Japan	2–2	New Zealand
Yamasaki 3'; Ke. Tanaka 40'	Report	Wilson 11'; Lane 41'

North Pitch
Umpires:
Ben Göntgen (GER)
Germán Montes de Oca (ARG)

28 July 2021
20:45
v

Japan	1–4	Spain
Zendana 2'	Report	Lleonart 3', 55'; Quemada 23'; Alegre 28'

North Pitch
Umpires:
Lim Hong Zhen (SGP)
Martin Madden (GBR)

30 July 2021
18:30
v

Japan	3–5	India
Ke. Tanaka 19'; Watanabe 33'; Murata 59'	Report	Harmanpreet 13'; Gurjant 17', 56'; Shamsher 34'; Nilakanta 51'

North Pitch
Umpires:
David Tomlinson (NZL)
Lim Hong Zhen (SGP)

=== Women's tournament ===
As the host nation, Japan women's field hockey team qualified for the Olympics by virtue of obtaining a world ranking equal to or better than thirtieth place by the end of 2018, or not finish lower than sixth at the 2018 Asian Games.

Team roster The squad was announced on 8 June 2021.

Head coach: (Spain) Xavier Arnau

No.	Pos.	Player	Date of birth (age)	Caps	Goals	Club
1	DF	Yu Asai	8 January 1996 (aged 25)	78	{{{goals}}}	(Japan) Coca-Cola Red Sparks
3	DF	Kimika Hoshi	26 January 1996 (aged 25)	46	{{{goals}}}	(Japan) Sony H.C. BRAVIA Ladies
6	DF	Emi Nishikori	9 January 1993 (aged 28)	73	{{{goals}}}	(Japan) Coca-Cola Red Sparks
7	FW	Kana Nomura	23 March 1990 (aged 31)	128	{{{goals}}}	(Japan) Southern Metropolis Silver Shooting Stars
8	MF	Yukari Mano (captain)	4 March 1994 (aged 27)	124	{{{goals}}}	(Japan) Sony H.C. BRAVIA Ladies
9	FW	Yuri Nagai	26 May 1992 (aged 29)	179	{{{goals}}}	(Japan) Sony H.C. BRAVIA Ladies
10	MF	Hazuki Nagai	15 August 1994 (aged 26)	173	{{{goals}}}	(Japan) Sony H.C. BRAVIA Ladies
11	DF	Shihori Oikawa	12 March 1989 (aged 32)	133	{{{goals}}}	(Japan) Tokyo Verdy Hockey Team
13	DF	Miki Kozuka	13 January 1996 (aged 25)	65	{{{goals}}}	(Japan) GlaxoSmithKline Orange United
14	MF	Maho Segawa	23 June 1996 (aged 25)	46	{{{goals}}}	(Japan) Tokyo Verdy Hockey Team
15	FW	Mai Toriyama	13 April 1995 (aged 26)	15	{{{goals}}}	(Japan) Southern Metropolis Silver Shooting Stars
16	DF	Natsuha Matsumoto	31 July 1995 (aged 25)	43	{{{goals}}}	(Japan) Coca-Cola Red Sparks
17	FW	Aki Yamada	24 November 1992 (aged 28)	27	{{{goals}}}	(Japan) Coca-Cola Red Sparks
18	FW	Aki Mitsuhashi	12 September 1989 (aged 31)		{{{goals}}}	
19	FW	Kanon Mori	1 May 1996 (aged 25)	28	{{{goals}}}	(Japan) Coca-Cola Red Sparks
25	FW	Kaho Tanaka	25 October 1997 (aged 23)		{{{goals}}}	
29	MF	Sakurako Omoto	19 March 1998 (aged 23)	31	{{{goals}}}	(Japan) Coca-Cola Red Sparks
32	GK	Sakiyo Asano	26 May 1987 (aged 34)	111	{{{goals}}}	(Japan) Gifu Morning Ladies

Group play

Pos	Team	Pld	W	D	L	GF	GA	GD	Pts	Qualification
1	Australia	5	5	0	0	13	1	+12	15	Quarterfinals
2	Spain	5	3	0	2	9	8	+1	9	Quarterfinals
3	Argentina	5	3	0	2	8	8	0	9	Quarterfinals
4	New Zealand	5	2	0	3	8	7	+1	6	Quarterfinals
5	China	5	2	0	3	9	16	−7	6	
6	Japan (H)	5	0	0	5	6	13	−7	0	

Source: Tokyo 2020 and FIH
Rules for classification: 1) points; 2) matches won; 3) goal difference; 4) goals for; 5) head-to-head result; 6) field goals scored.
(H) Hosts

25 July 2021
11:45
v

Japan	3–4	China
Nomura 21'; Y. Nagai 31'; H. Nagai 45+'	Report	Gu 10', 35'; Zhang Y. 20'; Liang 52'

North Pitch
Umpires:
Ayanna McClean (TTO)
Michelle Meister (GER)

26 July 2021
20:45
v

Japan	1–2	New Zealand
Oikawa 18'	Report	Merry 26'; Ralph 29'

North Pitch
Umpires:
Irene Presenqui (ARG)
Annelize Rostron (RSA)

28 July 2021
18:30
v

Japan	0–1	Australia
	Report	M. Fitzpatrick 33'

North Pitch
Umpires:
Maggie Giddens (USA)
Liu Xiaoying (CHN)

29 July 2021
20:45
v

Japan	1–2	Argentina
Mori 19'	Report	Gorzelany 10'; M. Granatto 45'

North Pitch
Umpires:
Kelly Hudson (NZL)
Ayanna McClean (TTO)

31 July 2021
10:00
v

Japan	1–4	Spain
Mori 6'	Report	Barrios 25'; García Grau 38'; Mejías 55'; Bonastre 57'

South Pitch
Umpires:
Sarah Wilson (GBR)
Maggie Giddens (USA)

== Football (soccer) ==
Summary

Key:

- A.E.T – After extra time.
- P – Match decided by penalty-shootout.

Team	Event	Group stage				Quarter-finals	Semi-finals	Bronze medal match	
Team	Event	Opposition Score	Opposition Score	Opposition Score	Rank	Opposition Score	Opposition Score	Opposition Score	Rank
Japan men's	Men's tournament	South Africa; W 1–0	Mexico; W 2–1	France; W 4–0	1 Q	New Zealand; D 0–0 (4–2)	Spain; L 0–1	Mexico; L 1–3	4
Japan women's	Women's tournament	Canada; D 1–1	Great Britain; L 0–1	Chile; W 1–0	3 Q	Sweden; L 1–3	Did not advance		8

=== Men's tournament ===
Japan men's football team automatically qualified for the Olympics as the host nation.

Team roster Japan's final squad was announced on 22 June 2021.

Head coach: Hajime Moriyasu

No.	Pos.	Player	Date of birth (age)	Club
1	GK	Keisuke Osako	28 July 1999 (aged 21)	(Japan Football Association) Sanfrecce Hiroshima
2	DF	Hiroki Sakai*	12 April 1990 (aged 31)	(French Football Federation) Marseille
3	DF	Yuta Nakayama	16 February 1997 (aged 24)	(Royal Dutch Football Association) PEC Zwolle
4	DF	Ko Itakura	27 January 1997 (aged 24)	(Royal Dutch Football Association) Groningen
5	DF	Maya Yoshida* (captain)	24 August 1988 (aged 32)	(Italian Football Federation) Sampdoria
6	MF	Wataru Endo*	9 February 1993 (aged 28)	(German Football Association) VfB Stuttgart
7	FW	Takefusa Kubo	4 June 2001 (aged 20)	(Royal Spanish Football Federation) Getafe
8	MF	Koji Miyoshi	26 March 1997 (aged 24)	(Royal Belgian Football Association) Antwerp
9	FW	Daizen Maeda	20 October 1997 (aged 23)	(Japan Football Association) Yokohama F. Marinos
10	MF	Ritsu Dōan	16 June 1998 (aged 23)	(German Football Association) Arminia Bielefeld
11	FW	Kaoru Mitoma	20 May 1997 (aged 24)	(Japan Football Association) Kawasaki Frontale
12	GK	Kosei Tani	22 November 2000 (aged 20)	(Japan Football Association) Shonan Bellmare
13	MF	Reo Hatate	21 November 1997 (aged 23)	(Japan Football Association) Kawasaki Frontale
14	DF	Takehiro Tomiyasu	5 November 1998 (aged 22)	(Italian Football Federation) Bologna
15	DF	Daiki Hashioka	17 May 1999 (aged 22)	(Royal Belgian Football Association) Sint-Truiden
16	FW	Yuki Soma	25 February 1997 (aged 24)	(Japan Football Association) Nagoya Grampus
17	MF	Ao Tanaka	10 September 1998 (aged 22)	(Japan Football Association) Kawasaki Frontale
18	FW	Ayase Ueda	28 August 1998 (aged 22)	(Japan Football Association) Kashima Antlers
19	FW	Daichi Hayashi	23 May 1997 (aged 24)	(Japan Football Association) Sagan Tosu
20	DF	Koki Machida	25 August 1997 (aged 23)	(Japan Football Association) Kashima Antlers
21	DF	Ayumu Seko	7 June 2000 (aged 21)	(Japan Football Association) Cerezo Osaka
22	GK	Zion Suzuki	21 August 2002 (aged 18)	(Japan Football Association) Urawa Red Diamonds

* Overage player

Group play

Pos	Team	Pld	W	D	L	GF	GA	GD	Pts	Qualification
1	Japan (H)	3	3	0	0	7	1	+6	9	Advance to knockout stage
2	Mexico	3	2	0	1	8	3	+5	6	Advance to knockout stage
3	France	3	1	0	2	5	11	−6	3	
4	South Africa	3	0	0	3	3	8	−5	0	

Source: TOCOG and FIFA
Rules for classification: Group stage tiebreakers
(H) Hosts
22 July 2021
20:00

Japan	1–0	South Africa
Kubo 71'	Report (TOCOG); Report (FIFA)

Tokyo Stadium, Chōfu
Referee: Jesús Valenzuela (Venezuela)

25 July 2021
20:00

Japan	2–1	Mexico
Kubo 6'; Dōan 11' (pen.)	Report (TOCOG); Report (FIFA)	Alvarado 85'

Saitama Stadium 2002, Saitama
Referee: Artur Soares Dias (Portugal)

28 July 2021
20:30

France	0–4	Japan
	Report (TOCOG); Report (FIFA)	Kubo 27'; Sakai 34'; Miyoshi 70'; Maeda 90+1'

International Stadium Yokohama, Yokohama
Referee: Iván Barton (El Salvador)

Quarterfinal

31 July 2021
18:00

Japan	0–0 (a.e.t.)	New Zealand
	Report (TOCOG); Report (FIFA)
Penalties
Ueda (penalty scored); Itakura (penalty scored); Nakayama (penalty scored); Yoshida (penalty scored)	4–2	(penalty scored) Wood; (penalty missed) Cacace; (penalty missed) Lewis; (penalty scored) McCowatt

Kashima Stadium, Kashima
Referee: Ismail Elfath (United States)

Semifinal

3 August 2021
20:00

Japan	0–1 (a.e.t.)	Spain
	Report (TOCOG); Report (FIFA)	Asensio 115'

Saitama Stadium 2002, Saitama
Referee: Kevin Ortega (Peru)

Bronze medal match

6 August 2021
18:00

Mexico	3–1	Japan
Córdova 13' (pen.); Vásquez 22'; Vega 58'	Report (TOCOG); Report (FIFA)	Mitoma 78'

Saitama Stadium 2002, Saitama
Referee: Bamlak Tessema Weyesa (Ethiopia)

=== Women's tournament ===
Japan women's football team automatically qualified for the Olympics as the host nation.

Team roster The final squad of 22 athletes was announced on 18 June 2021.

Head coach: Asako Takakura

No.	Pos.	Player	Date of birth (age)	Caps	Goals	Club
1	GK	Sakiko Ikeda	8 September 1992 (age 34)	18	0	(Japan Football Association) Urawa Reds
2	DF	Risa Shimizu	15 June 1996 (age 30)	37	1	(Japan Football Association) Nippon TV Tokyo Verdy Beleza
3	DF	Saori Takarada	27 December 1999 (age 26)	7	1	(United States Soccer Federation) Washington Spirit
4	DF	Saki Kumagai (captain)	17 October 1990 (age 36)	114	1	(French Football Federation) Lyon
5	DF	Moeka Minami	7 December 1998 (age 27)	15	1	(Japan Football Association) Urawa Reds
6	MF	Hina Sugita	31 January 1997 (age 29)	23	2	(Japan Football Association) INAC Kobe Leonessa
7	MF	Emi Nakajima	27 September 1990 (age 36)	85	14	(Japan Football Association) INAC Kobe Leonessa
8	MF	Narumi Miura	3 July 1997 (age 29)	24	1	(Japan Football Association) Nippon TV Tokyo Verdy Beleza
9	FW	Yuika Sugasawa	5 October 1990 (age 36)	75	24	(Japan Football Association) Urawa Reds
10	FW	Mana Iwabuchi	18 March 1993 (age 33)	77	35	(The Football Association) Aston Villa
11	FW	Mina Tanaka	28 April 1994 (age 32)	47	23	(Japan Football Association) INAC Kobe Leonessa
12	FW	Jun Endo	24 May 2000 (age 26)	17	1	(Japan Football Association) Nippon TV Tokyo Verdy Beleza
13	MF	Yuzuho Shiokoshi	1 November 1997 (age 28)	3	2	(Japan Football Association) Urawa Reds
14	MF	Yui Hasegawa	29 January 1997 (age 29)	46	11	(Italian Football Federation) Milan
15	FW	Yuka Momiki	9 April 1996 (age 30)	38	14	(United States Soccer Federation) OL Reign
16	DF	Asato Miyagawa	24 February 1998 (age 28)	14	0	(Japan Football Association) Nippon TV Tokyo Verdy Beleza
17	DF	Nanami Kitamura	25 November 1999 (age 26)	3	0	(Japan Football Association) Nippon TV Tokyo Verdy Beleza
18	GK	Ayaka Yamashita	29 September 1995 (age 31)	40	0	(Japan Football Association) Nippon TV Tokyo Verdy Beleza
19	DF	Shiori Miyake	13 October 1995 (age 31)	25	0	(Japan Football Association) INAC Kobe Leonessa
20	MF	Honoka Hayashi	19 May 1998 (age 28)	6	0	(Swedish Football Association) AIK
21	MF	Momoka Kinoshita	2 March 2003 (age 23)	4	1	(Japan Football Association) Nippon TV Tokyo Verdy Beleza
22	GK	Chika Hirao	31 December 1996 (age 29)	2	0	(Japan Football Association) Albirex Niigata

Group play

Pos	Team	Pld	W	D	L	GF	GA	GD	Pts	Qualification
1	Great Britain	3	2	1	0	4	1	+3	7	Advance to knockout stage
2	Canada	3	1	2	0	4	3	+1	5	Advance to knockout stage
3	Japan (H)	3	1	1	1	2	2	0	4	Advance to knockout stage
4	Chile	3	0	0	3	1	5	−4	0	

Source: TOCOG and FIFA
Rules for classification: Group stage tiebreakers
(H) Hosts
21 July 2021
19:30

Japan	1–1	Canada
Iwabuchi 84'	Report (TOCOG); Report (FIFA)	Sinclair 6'

Sapporo Dome, Sapporo
Attendance: 0
Referee: Edina Alves Batista (Brazil)

24 July 2021
19:30

Japan	0–1	Great Britain
	Report (TOCOG); Report (FIFA)	White 74'

Sapporo Dome, Sapporo
Attendance: 0
Referee: Anastasia Pustovoitova (Russia)

27 July 2021
20:00

Chile	0–1	Japan
	Report (TOCOG); Report (FIFA)	Tanaka 77'

Miyagi Stadium, Rifu
Attendance: 1,326
Referee: Melissa Borjas (Honduras)

Quarterfinal

30 July 2021
19:00

Sweden	3–1	Japan
Eriksson 7'; Blackstenius 53'; Asllani 68' (pen.)	Report (TOCOG); Report (FIFA)	Tanaka 23'

Saitama Stadium 2002, Saitama
Attendance: 0
Referee: Lucila Venegas (Mexico)

== Golf ==
Japan entered two male and two female golfers into the Olympic tournament.

Athlete	Event	Round 1	Round 2	Round 3	Round 4	Total		
Athlete	Event	Score	Score	Score	Score	Score	Par	Rank
Hideki Matsuyama	Men's	69	64	67	69	269	−15	=4
Rikuya Hoshino	Men's	71	68	73	66	278	−6	=38
Nasa Hataoka	Women's	70	68	67	69	274	−10	=9
Mone Inami	Women's	70	65	68	65	268	−16	2nd place, silver medalist(s)

== Gymnastics ==
=== Artistic ===
Japan fielded a full squad of four gymnasts each in both the men's and women artistic gymnastics events, respectively. The men's team secured a berth in the team all-around by winning a bronze at the 2018 World Artistic Gymnastics Championships in Doha, Qatar, while the women's team claimed one of the nine spots available at the 2019 World Artistic Gymnastics Championships in Stuttgart, Germany. The women's team was named on 15 May 2021 at the conclusion of the NHK Cup. The full men's team was announced on 6 June 2021.

==== Men ====
Team

Athlete	Event	Qualification								Final							
Athlete	Event	Apparatus						Total	Rank	Apparatus						Total	Rank
Athlete	Event	F	PH	R	V	PB	HB	Total	Rank	F	PH	R	V	PB	HB	Total	Rank
Daiki Hashimoto	Team	14.700	14.766	13.866	14.866	15.300	15.033 Q	88.531	1 Q	14.600	14.800	13.833	14.833	—N/a	15.100	—N/a	
Kazuma Kaya	Team	13.933	14.833 Q	14.366	13.200	15.100	14.033	85.465	9	—N/a	14.566	14.100	—N/a	15.000	14.200	—N/a	
Takeru Kitazono	Team	14.666	13.916	13.333	14.700	14.900	14.433 Q	85.948	7 Q	14.600	14.200	—N/a	14.166	15.000	14.500	—N/a	
Wataru Tanigawa	Team	14.466	13.833	14.300	13.666	15.241	13.400	84.906	13	14.500	—N/a	14.500	15.233	14.666	—N/a	—N/a	
Total	Team	43.832	42.515	42.532	43.232	45.641	43.499	262.251	1 Q	43.700	43.566	42.433	44.232	44.666	43.800	262.397	2nd place, silver medalist(s)

Individual finals

Athlete	Event	Qualification								Final							
Athlete	Event	Apparatus						Total	Rank	Apparatus						Total	Rank
Athlete	Event	F	PH	R	V	PB	HB	Total	Rank	F	PH	R	V	PB	HB	Total	Rank
Daiki Hashimoto	All-around	See team results								14.833	15.166	13.533	14.700	15.300	14.933	88.465	1st place, gold medalist(s)
Daiki Hashimoto	Horizontal bar	—N/a					15.033	15.033	1 Q	—N/a					15.066	15.066	1st place, gold medalist(s)
Kohei Kameyama	Pommel horse	—N/a	15.266	—N/a				15.266	2 Q	—N/a	14.600	—N/a				14.600	5
Kazuma Kaya	Pommel horse	—N/a	14.833	—N/a				14.833	7 Q	—N/a	14.900	—N/a				14.900	3rd place, bronze medalist(s)
Takeru Kitazono	All-around	See team results								14.566	14.500	13.500	14.666	15.066	14.400	86.698	5
Takeru Kitazono	Horizontal bar	—N/a					14.433	14.433	6 Q	—N/a					12.333	12.333	6
Kōhei Uchimura	Horizontal bar	—N/a					13.866	13.866	20	Did not advance							

==== Women ====
Team

Athlete	Event	Qualification						Final					
Athlete	Event	Apparatus				Total	Rank	Apparatus				Total	Rank
Athlete	Event	V	UB	BB	F	Total	Rank	V	UB	BB	F	Total	Rank
Hitomi Hatakeda	Team	12.266	14.133	13.000	13.333	52.732	39	—N/a	14.100	13.333	12.800	—N/a	
Yuna Hiraiwa	Team	13.733	11.700	13.533	12.666	51.632	49	13.900	—N/a	13.566	—N/a	—N/a	
Mai Murakami	Team	14.433	12.133	13.366	13.933 Q	53.965	23 Q	14.266	12.700	13.833	14.066	—N/a	
Aiko Sugihara	Team	14.266	13.366	11.566	13.333	52.531	41	14.183	13.333	—N/a	13.200	—N/a	
Total	Team	42.432	39.632	39.999	40.599	162.662	8 Q	42.349	40.133	40.732	40.066	163.280	5

Individual finals

Athlete	Event	Qualification						Final					
Athlete	Event	Apparatus				Total	Rank	Apparatus				Total	Rank
Athlete	Event	V	UB	BB	F	Total	Rank	V	UB	BB	F	Total	Rank
Urara Ashikawa	Balance beam	—N/a		13.900	—N/a	13.900	12 Q*	—N/a		13.733	—N/a	13.733	6
Mai Murakami	All-around	See team results						14.533	13.733	13.766	14.000	56.032	5
Mai Murakami	Floor exercise	—N/a			13.933	13.933	8 Q	—N/a			14.166	14.166	3rd place, bronze medalist(s)

=== Rhythmic ===
As the host nation, Japan automatically received a guaranteed place in the group all-around competition at the Games. One rhythmic gymnast was added to the roster by finishing in the top sixteen of the individual all-around at the 2019 World Championships in Baku. Chisaki Oiwa qualified an additional spot through the 2021 World Cup series. The athletes for the group all-around were announced on 2 July 2021.

Athlete	Event	Qualification						Final					
Athlete	Event	Hoop	Ball	Clubs	Ribbon	Total	Rank	Hoop	Ball	Clubs	Ribbon	Total	Rank
Chisaki Oiwa	Individual	23.100	19.600	23.600	21.250	87.550	19	Did not advance					
Sumire Kita	Individual	23.150	23.900	24.550	21.200	92.800	11	Did not advance					

Athletes	Event	Qualification				Final			
Athletes	Event	5 apps	3+2 apps	Total	Rank	5 apps.	3+2 apps	Total	Rank
Sakura Noshitani; Sayuri Sugimoto; Ayuka Suzuki; Nanami Takenaka; Kiko Yokota	Group	40.400	39.325	79.725	7 Q	42.750	29.750	72.500	8

=== Trampoline ===
Japan qualified one gymnast each for the men's and women's trampoline by finishing in the top eight, respectively, at the 2019 World Championships in Tokyo. Japan qualified an additional spot in both men's and women's trampoline through the 2019–2020 Trampoline World Cup series.

Athlete	Event	Qualification		Final	
Athlete	Event	Score	Rank	Score	Rank
Daiki Kishi	Men's	111.540	6 Q	57.815	7
Ryosuke Sakai	Men's	62.250	15	Did not advance	
Hikaru Mori	Women's	63.775	13	Did not advance	
Megu Uyama	Women's	103.585	5 Q	54.655	5

== Handball ==
Summary

Key:

- ET: After extra time
- P – Match decided by penalty-shootout.

Team	Event	Group stage						Quarter-finals	Semi-finals	GM / BM	
Team	Event	Opposition Score	Opposition Score	Opposition Score	Opposition Score	Opposition Score	Rank	Opposition Score	Opposition Score	Opposition Score	Rank
Japan men's	Men's tournament	Denmark; L 30–47	Sweden; L 26–28	Egypt; L 29–33	Bahrain; L 30–32	Portugal; W 31–30	6	Did not advance			
Japan women's	Women's tournament	Netherlands; L 21–32	Montenegro; W 29–26	South Korea; L 24–27	Angola; L 25–28	Norway; L 25–37	6	Did not advance			

=== Men's tournament ===
Japan men's handball team automatically qualified for the Olympics as the host nation.

Team roster The squad was announced on 8 July 2021.

Head coach: (Iceland) Dagur Sigurðsson

No.	Pos.	Name	Date of birth (age)	Height	App.	Goals	Club
10	LW	Naoki Sugioka	18 April 1994 (aged 27)	1.77 m	33	37	(Japan) Toyota Auto Body
12	GK	Yuta Iwashita	21 June 1991 (aged 30)	1.83 m	20	1	(Japan) Toyota Boshoku Kyushu
13	P	Kenya Kasahara	15 May 1988 (aged 33)	1.97 m	77	64	(Japan) Toyota Auto Body
15	LB	Adam Yuki Baig	12 April 1999 (aged 22)	1.94 m	43	79	(Japan) Chuo University
18	LB	Kohei Narita	15 June 1989 (aged 32)	1.91 m	93	136	(Japan) Wakunaga Pharmaceutical
19	RB	Shinnosuke Tokuda	6 December 1995 (aged 25)	1.78 m	63	224	(Japan) Toyoda Gosei
20	RB	Jin Watanabe	17 January 1990 (aged 31)	1.83 m	95	305	(Japan) Toyota Auto Body
21	LW	Remi Anri Doi	28 September 1989 (aged 31)	1.80 m	60	145	(Japan) Zeekstar Tokyo
22	GK	Motoki Sakai	10 November 1995 (aged 25)	1.92 m	25	3	(Japan) Toyoda Gosei
25	RW	Hiroki Motoki	14 February 1992 (aged 29)	1.82 m	86	235	(Japan) Osaki Osol
31	LB	Tatsuki Yoshino	13 July 1994 (aged 27)	1.83 m	46	181	(Japan) Toyota Auto Body
33	CB	Yuto Agarie	6 July 1993 (aged 28)	1.83 m	69	238	(Japan) Zeekstar Tokyo
38	CB	Kotaro Mizumachi	13 March 1995 (aged 26)	1.83 m	8	12	(Japan) Toyoda Gosei
41	RB	Rennosuke Tokuda	15 May 1998 (aged 23)	1.80 m	11	20	(Poland) Grupa Azoty Tarnów
43	P	Shuichi Yoshida	26 March 2001 (aged 20)	1.91 m	10	23	(Poland) Grupa Azoty Tarnów

Group play

Pos	Team	Pld	W	D	L	GF	GA	GD	Pts	Qualification
1	Denmark	5	4	0	1	174	139	+35	8 (Note: Denmark 2 Pts, +2 GD; Egypt 2 Pts, 0 GD, Sweden 2 Pts, −2 GD)	Quarter-finals
2	Egypt	5	4	0	1	154	134	+20	8	Quarter-finals
3	Sweden	5	4	0	1	144	142	+2	8	Quarter-finals
4	Bahrain	5	1	0	4	129	149	−20	2 (Note: Bahrain 2 Pts, +1 GD; Portugal 2 Pts, 0 GD, Japan 2 Pts, −1 GD)	Quarter-finals
5	Portugal	5	1	0	4	143	156	−13	2	
6	Japan (H)	5	1	0	4	146	170	−24	2	

Source: Tokyo 2020 and IHF
Rules for classification: 1) Points; 2) Head-to-head points; 3) Head-to-head goal difference; 4) Head-to-head goals scored; 5) Goal difference; 6) Goals scored; 7) Draw.
(H) Hosts
Notes:

24 July 2021; 21:30	Denmark	47–30	Japan	Yoyogi National Gymnasium, Tokyo; Referees: Schulze, Tönnies (GER)
24 July 2021; 21:30	Holm, Saugstrup 9	(25–14)	Motoki 8	Yoyogi National Gymnasium, Tokyo; Referees: Schulze, Tönnies (GER)
24 July 2021; 21:30	1× (yellow card) 1× (suspension)	Report	1× (yellow card) 4× (suspension)	Yoyogi National Gymnasium, Tokyo; Referees: Schulze, Tönnies (GER)

26 July 2021; 21:30	Japan	26–28	Sweden	Yoyogi National Gymnasium, Tokyo; Referees: Lah, Sok (SLO)
26 July 2021; 21:30	Motoki 6	(14–17)	Wanne 8	Yoyogi National Gymnasium, Tokyo; Referees: Lah, Sok (SLO)
26 July 2021; 21:30	1× (yellow card) 4× (suspension)	Report	1× (yellow card) 1× (suspension)	Yoyogi National Gymnasium, Tokyo; Referees: Lah, Sok (SLO)

28 July 2021; 14:15	Japan	29–33	Egypt	Yoyogi National Gymnasium, Tokyo; Referees: Schulze, Tönnies (GER)
28 July 2021; 14:15	Tokuda 8	(11–18)	El-Ahmar 8	Yoyogi National Gymnasium, Tokyo; Referees: Schulze, Tönnies (GER)
28 July 2021; 14:15	1× (yellow card) 7× (suspension)	Report	2× (suspension)	Yoyogi National Gymnasium, Tokyo; Referees: Schulze, Tönnies (GER)

30 July 2021; 11:00	Bahrain	32–30	Japan	Yoyogi National Gymnasium, Tokyo; Referees: Raluy, Sabroso (ESP)
30 July 2021; 11:00	Al-Sayyad, Habib 7	(17–16)	Motoki 7	Yoyogi National Gymnasium, Tokyo; Referees: Raluy, Sabroso (ESP)
30 July 2021; 11:00	2× (yellow card) 4× (suspension)	Report	4× (suspension)	Yoyogi National Gymnasium, Tokyo; Referees: Raluy, Sabroso (ESP)

1 August 2021; 09:00	Portugal	30–31	Japan	Yoyogi National Gymnasium, Tokyo; Referees: Brunner, Salah (SUI)
1 August 2021; 09:00	four players 4	(14–16)	R. Tokuda 6	Yoyogi National Gymnasium, Tokyo; Referees: Brunner, Salah (SUI)
1 August 2021; 09:00	2× (yellow card) 4× (suspension)	Report	2× (yellow card) 2× (suspension)	Yoyogi National Gymnasium, Tokyo; Referees: Brunner, Salah (SUI)

=== Women's tournament ===
Japan women's handball team automatically qualified for the Olympics as the host nation.

Team roster The squad was announced on 28 June 2021. On 30 July, Kaho Sunami was replaced by Mana Horikawa.

Head coach: (Denmark) Ulrik Kirkely

No.	Pos.	Name	Date of birth (age)	Height	App.	Goals	Club
3	P	Kaho Sunami	5 January 1993 (aged 28)	1.66 m	45	74	(Japan) Sony Semiconductor
4	RB	Yui Sunami	7 June 1991 (aged 30)	1.62 m	59	160	(Japan) Hokkoku Bank
5	LB	Sayo Shiota	21 March 1989 (aged 32)	1.72 m	66	62	(Japan) Hokkoku Bank
9	CB	Aya Yokoshima	3 July 1990 (aged 31)	1.62 m	55	160	(Japan) Hokkoku Bank
11	P	Mana Horikawa	4 March 1994 (aged 27)	1.74 m	17	2	(Japan) lzumi Maple Reds
12	GK	Minami Itano	2 February 1993 (aged 28)	1.74 m	26	1	(Japan) lzumi Maple Reds
18	LW	Yuki Tanabe	25 August 1989 (aged 31)	1.70 m	59	196	(Germany) Thüringer HC
21	RW	Ayaka Ikehara	24 September 1990 (aged 30)	1.58 m	43	101	(Denmark) Odense Håndbold
24	LB	Nozomi Hara	9 March 1991 (aged 30)	1.70 m	78	224	(Japan) MIE violet' IRIS
25	CB	Mana Ohyama	7 December 1992 (aged 28)	1.65 m	45	105	(Japan) Hokkoku Bank
27	LB	Haruno Sasaki	26 February 1995 (aged 26)	1.72 m	23	80	(Japan) Hokkoku Bank
28	P	Shiori Nagata	24 October 1987 (aged 33)	1.71 m	109	92	(Japan) Omron
30	GK	Sakura Hauge	7 January 1987 (aged 34)	1.74 m	49	5	(France) ESBF Besançon
34	LW	Maharu Kondo	24 January 1996 (aged 25)	1.58 m	0	0	(Japan) lzumi Maple Reds
40	RB	Shio Fujii	27 March 1985 (aged 36)	1.64 m	121	613	(Japan) Osaka Lovvits
81	CB	Mayuko Ishitate	18 January 1987 (aged 34)	1.67 m	96	201	(Japan) MIE violet' IRIS

Group play

Pos	Team	Pld	W	D	L	GF	GA	GD	Pts	Qualification
1	Norway	5	5	0	0	170	123	+47	10	Quarter-finals
2	Netherlands	5	4	0	1	169	143	+26	8	Quarter-finals
3	Montenegro	5	2	0	3	139	142	−3	4	Quarter-finals
4	South Korea	5	1	1	3	147	165	−18	3 (Note: South Korea 31–31 Angola)	Quarter-finals
5	Angola	5	1	1	3	130	156	−26	3	
6	Japan (H)	5	1	0	4	124	150	−26	2	

Source: Tokyo 2020 and IHF
Rules for classification: 1) Points; 2) Head-to-head points; 3) Head-to-head goal difference; 4) Head-to-head goals scored; 5) Goal difference; 6) Goals scored; 7) Draw.
(H) Hosts
Notes:

25 July 2021; 09:00	Netherlands	32–21	Japan	Yoyogi National Gymnasium, Tokyo; Referees: García, Paolantoni (ARG)
25 July 2021; 09:00	Abbingh 7	(18–10)	Fujii 5	Yoyogi National Gymnasium, Tokyo; Referees: García, Paolantoni (ARG)
25 July 2021; 09:00	2× (suspension)	Report	1× (yellow card) 3× (suspension)	Yoyogi National Gymnasium, Tokyo; Referees: García, Paolantoni (ARG)

27 July 2021; 09:00	Japan	29–26	Montenegro	Yoyogi National Gymnasium, Tokyo; Referees: Alpaidze, Berezkina (RUS)
27 July 2021; 09:00	Hara, Ikehara 6	(14–13)	Brnović 6	Yoyogi National Gymnasium, Tokyo; Referees: Alpaidze, Berezkina (RUS)
27 July 2021; 09:00	1× (yellow card) 8× (suspension) 1× (red card)	Report	2× (yellow card) 3× (suspension)	Yoyogi National Gymnasium, Tokyo; Referees: Alpaidze, Berezkina (RUS)

29 July 2021; 14:15	Japan	24–27	South Korea	Yoyogi National Gymnasium, Tokyo; Referees: Kurtagic, Wetterwik (SWE)
29 July 2021; 14:15	Kondo 7	(11–12)	Ryu 9	Yoyogi National Gymnasium, Tokyo; Referees: Kurtagic, Wetterwik (SWE)
29 July 2021; 14:15	1× (yellow card) 3× (suspension)	Report	3× (suspension)	Yoyogi National Gymnasium, Tokyo; Referees: Kurtagic, Wetterwik (SWE)

31 July 2021; 09:00	Angola	28–25	Japan	Yoyogi National Gymnasium, Tokyo; Referees: García, Paolantoni (ARG)
31 July 2021; 09:00	three players 5	(15–13)	Hara 6	Yoyogi National Gymnasium, Tokyo; Referees: García, Paolantoni (ARG)
31 July 2021; 09:00	1× (yellow card) 2× (suspension)	Report	1× (yellow card) 1× (suspension)	Yoyogi National Gymnasium, Tokyo; Referees: García, Paolantoni (ARG)

2 August 2021; 21:30	Norway	37–25	Japan	Yoyogi National Gymnasium, Tokyo; Referees: El-Saied, El-Saied (EGY)
2 August 2021; 21:30	Frafjord 6	(16–11)	Ohyama, Yokoshima 5	Yoyogi National Gymnasium, Tokyo; Referees: El-Saied, El-Saied (EGY)
2 August 2021; 21:30	3× (suspension)	Report	2× (yellow card) 1× (suspension)	Yoyogi National Gymnasium, Tokyo; Referees: El-Saied, El-Saied (EGY)

== Judo ==
As the host nation, Japanese judoka have already received fourteen quota places (seven in each gender) at their disposal for the Games.

On November 24, 2019, Akira Sone (women's +78 kg) became the first judoka to be selected to the host nation's squad for the Games, following her triumph at the IJF Grand Slam Cup in Osaka. Twelve more judoka were officially named to the roster on February 27, 2020, with Shohei Ono looking to defend his Olympic title in the men's 73-kg division on the home soil. Meanwhile, Hifumi Abe trounced the reigning world champion Joshiro Maruyama to lock the men's 66 kg spot in a gruelling 24-minute playoff at the Kodokan Judo Institute on December 13, 2020, completing the host nation's judo roster for the rescheduled Games.

=== Men ===
Athlete	Event	Round of 64	Round of 32	Round of 16	Quarterfinals	Semifinals	Repechage	Final / BM	
Athlete	Event	Opposition Result	Opposition Result	Opposition Result	Opposition Result	Opposition Result	Opposition Result	Opposition Result	Rank
Naohisa Takato	−60 kg	—N/a	Bye	Verstraeten (BEL); W 01–00	Chkhvimiani (GEO); W 10–00	Smetov (KAZ); W 01–00	Bye	Yang Y-w (TPE); W 10–00	1st place, gold medalist(s)
Hifumi Abe	−66 kg	—N/a	Bye	Le Blouch (FRA); W 10–00	Yondonperenlei (MGL); W 01–00	Cargnin (BRA); W 10–00	Bye	Margvelashvili (GEO); W 01–00	1st place, gold medalist(s)
Shohei Ono	−73 kg	Bye	Raicu (ROU); W 10–00	Çiloğlu (TUR); W 10–00	Orujov (AZE); W 10–00	Tsend-Ochir (MGL); W 01–00	Bye	Shavdatuashvili (GEO); W 01–00	1st place, gold medalist(s)
Takanori Nagase	−81 kg	Bye	Albayrak (TUR); W 10–00	Parlati (ITA); W 10–00	Ressel (GER); W 01–00	Casse (BEL); W 01–00	Bye	Mollaei (MGL); W 01–00	1st place, gold medalist(s)
Shoichiro Mukai	−90 kg	Bye	Feuillet (MRI); W 10–00	Tóth (HUN); L 00–10	Did not advance				
Aaron Wolf	−100 kg	—N/a	Bye	Khurramov (UZB); W 10–00	Paltchik (ISR); W 01–00	Liparteliani (GEO); W 01–00	Bye	Cho G-h (KOR); W 10–00	1st place, gold medalist(s)
Hisayoshi Harasawa	+100 kg	—N/a	Bye	Kim M-j (KOR); W 01–00	Khammo (UKR); W 10–00	Krpálek (CZE); L 00–01	Bye	Riner (FRA); L 00–10	5

=== Women ===
Athlete	Event	Round of 32	Round of 16	Quarterfinals	Semifinals	Repechage	Final / BM	
Athlete	Event	Opposition Result	Opposition Result	Opposition Result	Opposition Result	Opposition Result	Opposition Result	Rank
Funa Tonaki	−48 kg	Bye	Csernoviczki (HUN); W 10–00	Pareto (ARG); W 10–00	Bilodid (UKR); W 01–00	Bye	Krasniqi (KOS); L 00–01	2nd place, silver medalist(s)
Uta Abe	−52 kg	Bye	Pimenta (BRA); W 10–00	Giles (GBR); W 01–00	Giuffrida (ITA); W 01–00	Bye	Buchard (FRA); W 10–00	1st place, gold medalist(s)
Tsukasa Yoshida	−57 kg	Bye	Lu Tj (CHN); W 10–00	Nelson-Levy (ISR); W 01–00	Gjakova (KOS); L 00–01	Bye	Liparteliani (GEO); W 10–00	3rd place, bronze medalist(s)
Miku Tashiro	−63 kg	Renshall (GBR); W 01–00	Ozdoba-Błach (POL); L 00–10	Did not advance				
Chizuru Arai	−70 kg	Bye	Pérez (PUR); W 10–00	Scoccimarro (GER); W 10–00	Taimazova (ROC); W 10–00	Bye	Polleres (AUT); W 01–00	1st place, gold medalist(s)
Shori Hamada	−78 kg	Bye	Pacut (POL); W 10–00	Babintseva (ROC); W 11–00	Wagner (GER); W 10–00	Bye	Malonga (FRA); W 10–00	1st place, gold medalist(s)
Akira Sone	+78 kg	Bye	Hershko (ISR); W 11–00	Sayit (TUR); W 10–00	Kindzerska (AZE); W 10–00	Bye	Ortíz (CUB); W 10–00	1st place, gold medalist(s)

=== Mixed ===
Athlete	Event	Round of 16	Quarterfinals	Semifinals	Repechage	Final / BM	
Athlete	Event	Opposition Result	Opposition Result	Opposition Result	Opposition Result	Opposition Result	Rank
Shoichiro Mukai; Shohei Ono; Aaron Wolf; Uta Abe; Chizuru Arai; Akira Sone; Tsukasa Yoshida	Team	Bye	Germany; W 4–2	ROC; W 4–0	Bye	France; L 1–4	2nd place, silver medalist(s)

== Karate ==
As the host nation, Japanese karateka have already received eight quota places (four in each gender) at their disposal for the Games. With the cancellation of the last qualifying tournaments before the April 6, 2020 cutoff because of the coronavirus pandemic, World Karate Federation officially named the Japanese karateka to take up the host nation places based on the country's selection criteria. Among the country's karateka were three-time world champion Ryo Kiyuna in the men's individual kata and multiple world medalist Ayumi Uekusa in the women's +61-kg kumite.

Kumite

Athlete	Event	Group stage					Semifinals	Final	
Athlete	Event	Opposition Result	Opposition Result	Opposition Result	Opposition Result	Rank	Opposition Result	Opposition Result	Rank
Naoto Sago	Men's −67 kg	El-Sawy (EGY); W 4–3	Farzaliyev (AZE); L 0–1	Assadilov (KAZ); L 0–3	Şamdan (TUR); L 1–2	4	Did not advance		
Ken Nishimura	Men's −75 kg	Scott (USA); W 2–0	Horuna (UKR); L 1–2	Abdelaziz (EGY); W 8–7	Hárspataki (HUN); L 1–3	3	Did not advance		
Ryutaro Araga	Men's +75 kg	Arkania (GEO); W 3–2	Yuldashev (KAZ); W 4–2	Aktaş (TUR); W 5–3	Horne (GER); W WO	1 Q	Hamedi (KSA); L 0–2	Did not advance	3rd place, bronze medalist(s)
Miho Miyahara	Women's −55 kg	Plank (AUT); W 6–2	Sayed (EGY); L 3–5	Zhangbyrbay (KAZ); W 11–2	Terliuga (UKR); L 0–4	3	Did not advance		
Mayumi Someya	Women's −61 kg	Çoban (TUR); L 4–0	Heurtault (FRA); W 6–3	Yin Xy (CHN); L 2–4	Garcés (VEN); L 5–8	4	Did not advance		
Ayumi Uekusa	Women's +61 kg	Semeraro (ITA); L 3–4	Zaretska (AZE); L 1–4	Hocaoğlu (TUR); W 5–4	Berultseva (KAZ); W 5–1	3	Did not advance		

Kata

Athlete	Event	Elimination round		Ranking round		Final / BM	
Athlete	Event	Score	Rank	Score	Rank	Opposition Result	Rank
Ryo Kiyuna	Men's kata	28.33	1 Q	28.72	1 Q	Quintero (ESP); W 28.72–27.66	1st place, gold medalist(s)
Kiyou Shimizu	Women's kata	27.70	1 Q	27.86	1 Q	Sánchez (ESP); L 27.88–28.06	2nd place, silver medalist(s)

== Modern pentathlon ==
Japanese athletes qualified for the following spots to compete in modern pentathlon. Rio 2016 Olympians Shōhei Iwamoto and Natsumi Tomonaga confirmed places each in the men's and women's event, respectively, with the former finishing fourth and the latter second among those eligible for Olympic qualification at the 2019 Asia & Oceania Championships in Kunming, China.

Athlete	Event	Fencing (épée one touch)				Swimming (200 m freestyle)			Riding (show jumping)			Combined: shooting/running (10 m air pistol)/(3200 m)			Total points	Final rank
Athlete	Event	RR	BR	Rank	MP points	Time	Rank	MP points	Penalties	Rank	MP points	Time	Rank	MP Points	Total points	Final rank
Shōhei Iwamoto	Men's	12–23	1	30	173	2:03.75	20	303	21	20	279	11:52.87	31	588	1343	28
Rena Shimazu	Women's	14–21	0	30	184	2:10.65	9	289	48	24	252	12:34.40	17	546	1271	23
Natsumi Takamiya	Women's	14–21	1	28	185	2:11.54	11	287	EL	31	0	2:11.54	26	513	985	34

== Rowing ==
Japan qualified two boats for each of the following rowing classes into the Olympic regatta. Rowing crews in the men's single sculls and women's lightweight double sculls confirmed Olympic places for their boats at the 2021 FISA Asia & Oceania Olympic Qualification Regatta in Tokyo.

Athlete	Event	Heats		Repechage		Quarterfinals		Semifinals		Final	
Athlete	Event	Time	Rank	Time	Rank	Time	Rank	Time	Rank	Time	Rank
Ryuta Arakawa	Men's single sculls	7:02.79	2 QF	Bye		7:26.04	3 SA/B	6:59.26	6 FB	6:50.91	11
Chiaki Tomita; Ayami Oishi	Women's lightweight double sculls	7:22.47	3 R	7:34.45	3 SA/B	—N/a		6:56.52	5 FB	6:54.94	10

Qualification Legend: FA=Final A (medal); FB=Final B (non-medal); FC=Final C (non-medal); FD=Final D (non-medal); FE=Final E (non-medal); FF=Final F (non-medal); SA/B=Semifinals A/B; SC/D=Semifinals C/D; SE/F=Semifinals E/F; QF=Quarterfinals; R=Repechage

== Rugby sevens ==
=== Men's tournament ===
Japan men's rugby sevens team automatically qualified for the Olympics as the host nation.

Team roster Japan's 12-man squad plus one alternate was named on 6 July 2021.

Head coach: Kensuke Iwabuchi

No.	Pos.	Player	Date of birth (age)	Events	Points
1	FW	Jose Seru	9 February 1991 (aged 30)	3	0
2	FW	Lote Tuqiri	12 November 1987 (aged 33)	26	145
3	FW	Colin Bourke	15 October 1984 (aged 36)	2	27
4	BK	Kazushi Hano	21 June 1991 (aged 30)	16	80
5	FW	Kameli Soejima	1 June 1983 (aged 38)	21	222
6	FW	Masakatsu Hikosaka	18 January 1991 (aged 30)	13	40
7	BK	Brackin Karauria-Henry	31 July 1988 (aged 33)	8	150
8	BK	Chihito Matsui (c)	11 November 1994 (aged 26)	11	35
9	BK	Ryota Kano	10 May 1992 (aged 29)	10	37
10	BK	Yoshikazu Fujita	8 September 1993 (aged 27)	20	150
11	BK	Kippei Ishida	28 April 2000 (aged 21)	5	20
12	BK	Naoki Motomura	11 April 1992 (aged 29)	14	95
13	BK	Kazuhiro Goya	12 April 1993 (aged 28)	15	65

Group play

Pos	Team	Pld	W	D	L	PF	PA	PD	Pts	Qualification
1	Fiji	3	3	0	0	85	40	+45	9	Quarter-finals
2	Great Britain	3	2	0	1	65	33	+32	7	Quarter-finals
3	Canada	3	1	0	2	50	64	−14	5	Quarter-finals
4	Japan (H)	3	0	0	3	31	94	−63	3	

Source: Tokyo 2020 and World Rugby
Rules for classification: 1) Points; 2) Head-to-head result; 3) Point difference; 4) Points scored.
(H) Hosts

26 July 2021
9:00

Fiji	24–19	Japan
Try: Wainiqolo 1' c Masi 4' m Nacuqu (2) 10' c, 11' m Con: Bolaca (1/2) 1'; Nacuqu (1/1) 10'; Nasoko (0/1)	(Tokyo 2020)	Try: Matsui 2' c Tuqiri 7' c Soejima 8' m Con: Fujita (2/3) 3', 7'

Tokyo Stadium, Tokyo
Attendance: 0
Referee: Damon Murphy (Australia)

26 July 2021
16:30

Great Britain	34–0	Japan
Try: Bibby 1' m Mitchell 2' m Glover 7' c Harris 8' m Waddleton 9' m Davis 12' c Con: Bibby (2/6) 7', 12'	(Tokyo 2020)

Tokyo Stadium, Tokyo
Attendance: 0
Referee: Paulo Duarte (Portugal)

27 July 2021
9:00

Canada	36–12	Japan
Try: Braid (3) 2' c, 3' m, 9' m Sauder 5' c Berna 10' m Douglas 12' c Con: Hirayama (2/5) 2', 5'; Kay (1/1) 12'	(Tokyo 2020)	Try: Hano 8' m Matsui 13' c Con: Bourke (0/1); Goya (1/1) 13'

Tokyo Stadium, Tokyo
Attendance: 0
Referee: Damon Murphy (Australia)

9–12th place playoff

27 July 2021
17:00

Kenya	21–7	Japan
Try: Otieno 3' c Oluoch 5' c Amonde 12' c Con: Olindi (3/3) 4', 5', 12'	(Tokyo 2020)	Try: Matsui 1' c Con: Kano (1/1) 2'

Tokyo Stadium, Tokyo
Attendance: 0
Referee: Damián Schneider (Argentina)

11th place match

28 July 2021
9:00

South Korea	19–31	Japan
Try: Coquillard 1' c Jang 4' m Jeong 10' c Con: Coquillard (2/3) 1', 10'	(Tokyo 2020)	Try: Tuqiri 2' c Hikosaka 5' c Kano 7' m Matsui 8' c Hano 11' m Con: Kano (3/4) 2', 6', 8'; Fujita (0/1)

Tokyo Stadium, Tokyo
Attendance: 0
Referee: Richard Haughton (England)

=== Women's tournament ===
Japan women's rugby sevens team automatically qualified for the Olympics as the host nation.

Team roster Japan's squad of 12 players was named on 19 June 2021.

Head coach: Hare Makiri

- Wakaba Hara
- Yume Hirano
- Haruka Hirotsu
- Marin Kajiki
- Mifuyu Koide
- Mio Yamanaka
- Riho Kurogi
- Hana Nagata
- Mei Ohtani
- Raichel Bativakalolo (c)
- Mayu Shimizu (c)
- Miyu Shirako
- Honoka Tsutsumi

Group play

Pos	Team	Pld	W	D	L	PF	PA	PD	Pts	Qualification
1	United States	3	3	0	0	59	33	+26	9	Quarter-finals
2	Australia	3	2	0	1	86	24	+62	7	Quarter-finals
3	China	3	1	0	2	53	54	−1	5	Quarter-finals
4	Japan (H)	3	0	0	3	7	94	−87	3	

Source: Tokyo 2020 and World Rugby
Rules for classification: 1) Points; 2) Head-to-head result; 3) Point difference; 4) Points scored.
(H) Hosts

29 July 2021
10:30

Australia	48–0	Japan
Try: Caslick 1' c Tonegato (3) 3' m, 7' +1 m, 10' m Hayes (2) 6' c, 8' c Levi (2) 11' c, 14' m Con: Williams (3/3) 1', 6', 8'; Hinds (1/2) 12'	(Tokyo 2020)

Tokyo Stadium, Tokyo

29 July 2021
18:00

United States	17–7	Japan
Try: Maher 1' m Matyas 4' m Ramsey 9' c Con: Canett-Oca (0/2); Heavirland (1/1) 9'	(Tokyo 2020)	Try: Koide 13' c Con: Yamanaka (1/1) 13'

Tokyo Stadium, Tokyo

30 July 2021
10:00

China	29–0	Japan
Try: Xu (2) 1' c, 5' m Wang 2' c Tang 8' m Yang 13' m Con: Chen (2/4) 1', 2'; Yu (0/1)	(Tokyo 2020)

Tokyo Stadium, Tokyo

9–12th place playoff

30 July 2021
17:00

Kenya	21–17	Japan
Try: Okulu 3' c Omondi 7' c Atieno 14' +1 c Con: Okulu (3/3) 3', 8', 14' +1	(Tokyo 2020)	Try: Hara 1' m Koide 8' m Kajiki 10' c Con: Yamanaka (1/3) 10'

Tokyo Stadium, Tokyo

11th place match

31 July 2021
9:00

Brazil	21–12	Japan
Try: Kochhann 2' c Silva 7' c Fioravanti 13' c Con: Cerullo (2/2) 2', 7'; Kochhann (1/1) 13'	(Tokyo 2020)	Try: Hirotsu 3' c Hara 6' m Con: Yamanaka (1/2) 4'

Tokyo Stadium, Tokyo

== Sailing ==
As the host nation, Japan has been guaranteed one boat for each of the following classes at the Tokyo regatta, bringing the maximum quota of 15 sailors, in ten boats.

At the end of 2019 season, the Japanese Olympic Committee announced the first set of sailors to compete at the Enoshima regatta, including multiple world medalists Ai Kondo and Miho Yoshioka in the women's 470 class and three-time Olympian Makoto Tomizawa in men's windsurfing. The 49er, 49erFX, and Nacra 17 crews were added to the roster on February 15, 2020, with windsurfer Yuki Sunaga and Laser Radial sailor Manami Doi joining them two weeks later upon the completion of their respective class-associated Worlds.

=== Men ===
Athlete	Event	Race													Net points	Final rank
Athlete	Event	1	2	3	4	5	6	7	8	9	10	11	12	M*	Net points	Final rank
Makoto Tomizawa	RS:X	10	21	11	16	~~DNF~~	14	17	11	11	16	11	11	EL	149	16
Kenji Nanri	Laser	27	30	~~33~~	19	25	16	24	29	31	18	—N/a		EL	219	30
Kazumasa Segawa	Finn	18	16	17	12	15	16	~~19~~	12	17	5	—N/a		EL	128	16
Jumpei Hokazono; Keiju Okada	470	7	4	4	11	13	9	5	4	~~15~~	13	—N/a		12	82	7
Ibuki Koizumi; Leonard Takahashi	49er	~~17~~	11	13	11	15	11	4	12	4	8	3	16	EL	108	11

=== Women ===
Athlete	Event	Race													Net points	Final rank
Athlete	Event	1	2	3	4	5	6	7	8	9	10	11	12	M*	Net points	Final rank
Yuki Sunaga	RS:X	17	~~24~~	11	3	5	12	11	22	10	7	14	17	EL	129	12
Manami Doi	Laser Radial	16	9	10	23	11	~~28~~	15	16	13	17	—N/a		EL	130	15
Ai Kondo; Miho Yoshioka	470	6	7	11	~~15~~	2	2	12	8	7	8	—N/a		16	79	7
Sena Takano; Anna Yamazaki	49erFX	7	16	~~UFD~~	17	16	UFD	9	19	11	4	13	15	EL	149	18

=== Mixed ===
Athlete	Event	Race													Net points	Final rank
Athlete	Event	1	2	3	4	5	6	7	8	9	10	11	12	M*	Net points	Final rank
Shibuki Iitsuka; Eri Hatayama	Nacra 17	12	18	15	12	15	16	14	6	14	~~19~~	15	13	EL	150	15

M = Medal race; EL = Eliminated – did not advance into the medal race

== Shooting ==
As the host nation, Japan has been guaranteed a minimum of twelve quota places with one in each of the individual events. Additionally, a shooter qualified for one event may compete in others without affecting the quotas, as long as they obtained a minimum qualifying score (MQS) by 30 April 2020.

=== Men ===
Athlete	Event	Qualification		Final	
Athlete	Event	Points	Rank	Points	Rank
Kojiro Horimizu	10 m air pistol	576	15	Did not advance	
Hiroyuki Ikawa	Skeet	114	27	Did not advance	
Takayuki Matsumoto	10 m air rifle	621.7	37	Did not advance	
Takayuki Matsumoto	50 m rifle 3 positions	1145	37	Did not advance	
Naoya Okada	10 m air rifle	625.7	20	Did not advance	
Naoya Okada	50 m rifle 3 positions	1158	31	Did not advance	
Shigetaka Oyama	Trap	115	29	Did not advance	
Dai Yoshioka	25 m rapid fire pistol	582	8	Did not advance	

=== Women ===
Athlete	Event	Qualification		Final	
Athlete	Event	Points	Rank	Points	Rank
Shiori Hirata	10 m air rifle	622.1	34	Did not advance	
Shiori Hirata	50 m rifle 3 positions	1169	11	Did not advance	
Naoko Ishihara	Skeet	114	21	Did not advance	
Haruka Nakaguchi	10 m air rifle	622.2	32	Did not advance	
Yukie Nakayama	Trap	115	19	Did not advance	
Chizuru Sasaki	10 m air pistol	556	50	Did not advance	
Chizuru Sasaki	25 m pistol	567	40	Did not advance	
Satoko Yamada	10 m air pistol	570	23	Did not advance	
Satoko Yamada	25 m pistol	563	43	Did not advance	

=== Mixed ===
Athlete	Event	Qualification		Semifinal		Final / BM	
Athlete	Event	Points	Rank	Points	Rank	Points	Rank
Takayuki Matsumoto; Shiori Hirata	10 m air rifle team	620.3	26	Did not advance			
Naoya Okada; Haruka Nakaguchi	10 m air rifle team	625.6	13	Did not advance			
Kojiro Horimizu; Satoko Yamada	10 m air pistol team	559	20	Did not advance			
Shigetaka Oyama; Yukie Nakayama	Trap team	145	5	Did not advance			

== Skateboarding ==
Japan qualified ten skateboarder into the olympic competition. Six skateboarder (two men and three women) qualified after being ranked in top 16 based on the Olympic World Skateboarding Rankings List of 30 June 2021, and four skateboarder in men's and women's park events after winning the gold, silver and bronze medal at 2021 Street Skateboarding World Championships in Rome, Italy.

=== Men ===
Athlete	Event	Qualification		Final	
Athlete	Event	Points	Rank	Points	Rank
Ayumu Hirano	Park	62.03	14	Did not advance	
Yukito Aoki	Street	18.60	17	Did not advance	
Yuto Horigome	Street	33.75	6 Q	37.18	1st place, gold medalist(s)
Sora Shirai	Street	31.52	9	Did not advance	

=== Women ===
Athlete	Event	Qualification		Final	
Athlete	Event	Points	Rank	Points	Rank
Kokona Hiraki	Park	52.46	3 Q	59.04	2nd place, silver medalist(s)
Misugu Okamoto	Park	58.51	1 Q	53.58	4
Sakura Yosozumi	Park	45.98	4 Q	60.09	1st place, gold medalist(s)
Funa Nakayama	Street	15.77	1 Q	14.49	3rd place, bronze medalist(s)
Aori Nishimura	Street	12.82	5 Q	6.92	8
Momiji Nishiya	Street	15.40	2 Q	15.26	1st place, gold medalist(s)

== Softball ==
Japan women's national softball team automatically qualified for the Olympics as the host nation.

Summary Legend: W – Win L – Lose D – Draw

Team	Event	Round robin						GM / BM	
Team	Event	Opposition Result	Opposition Result	Opposition Result	Opposition Result	Opposition Result	Rank	Opposition Result	Rank
Japan women's	Women's tournament	Australia; W 8–1	Mexico; W 3–2	Italy; W 5–0	Canada; W 1–0	United States; L 1–2	2 Q	United States; W 2–0	1st place, gold medalist(s)

Team roster The roster was released on 23 March 2021.

Softball at the 2020 Summer Olympics – Japan roster
Players		Coaches
Pitchers: 16 Yamato Fujita; 17 Yukiko Ueno; 27 Miu Goto	Catchers: 1 Yukiyo Mine; 21 Nayu Kiyohara; 25 Haruka Agatsuma; Infielders: 4 Yuka Ichiguchi; 5 Yu Yamamoto; 10 Hitomi Kawabata; 12 Mana Atsumi; 14 Minori Naito; Outfielders: 2 Saki Yamazaki; 8 Nodoka Harada; 9 Sayaka Mori; 11 Eri Yamada	Manager: 0 Reika Utsugi; Coaches: Noriko Yamaji

Group play

Pos	Team	Pld	W	L	RF	RA	RD	PCT	GB	Qualification
1	United States	5	5	0	9	2	+7	1.000	—	Gold medal match
2	Japan (H)	5	4	1	18	5	+13	.800	1	Gold medal match
3	Canada	5	3	2	19	4	+15	.600	2	Bronze medal match
4	Mexico	5	2	3	11	10	+1	.400	3	Bronze medal match
5	Australia	5	1	4	5	21	−16	.200	4	
6	Italy	5	0	5	1	21	−20	.000	5	

Source: Tokyo 2020 and WBSC
(H) Hosts

21 July 08:55 (JST) Fukushima Azuma Baseball Stadium 31 °C (88 °F)
Team	1	2	3	4	5	6	7	R	H	E
Australia	1	0	0	0	0	X	X	1	2	2
Japan (5)	1	0	2	3	2	X	X	8	6	0
WP: Yukiko Ueno (1–0) LP: Kaia Parnaby (0–1); Home runs: AUS: None; JPN: Minori Naito (1), Yamato Fujita (1), Yu Yamamoto (1); Boxscore

22 July 12:00 (JST) Fukushima Azuma Baseball Stadium 28 °C (82 °F)
Team	1	2	3	4	5	6	7	8	R	H	E
Mexico	0	0	0	0	1	0	1	0	2	6	0
Japan (8)	0	1	0	0	1	0	0	1	3	5	0
WP: Miu Goto (1–0) LP: Danielle O'Toole (0–1); Home runs: MEX: Anissa Urtez (1); JPN: Yamato Fujita (2); Boxscore

24 July 20:00 (JST) Yokohama Stadium 28 °C (82 °F)
Team	1	2	3	4	5	6	7	R	H	E
Japan	0	0	0	2	0	3	0	5	6	0
Italy	0	0	0	0	0	0	0	0	3	0
WP: Miu Goto (2–0) LP: Alexia Lacatena (0–1); Home runs: JPN: Yu Yamamoto (2), Yamato Fujita (3); ITA: None; Boxscore

25 July 14:30 (JST) Yokohama Stadium 33 °C (91 °F)
Team	1	2	3	4	5	6	7	8	R	H	E
Canada	0	0	0	0	0	0	0	0	0	4	1
Japan (8)	0	0	0	0	0	0	0	1	1	6	0
WP: Miu Goto (3–0) LP: Danielle Lawrie (0–1); Boxscore

26 July 10:00 (JST) Yokohama Stadium 29 °C (84 °F)
Team	1	2	3	4	5	6	7	R	H	E
Japan	1	0	0	0	0	0	0	1	4	0
United States	0	0	0	0	0	1	1	2	4	1
WP: Monica Abbott (3–0) LP: Yamato Fujita (0–1); Home runs: JPN: None; USA: Kelsey Stewart (1); Boxscore

Gold medal match

27 July 20:00 (JST) Yokohama Stadium
Team	1	2	3	4	5	6	7	R	H	E
Japan (gold)	0	0	0	1	1	0	0	2	8	0
United States (silver)	0	0	0	0	0	0	0	0	3	0
WP: Yukiko Ueno (2–0) LP: Ally Carda (0–1); Boxscore

== Sport climbing ==
Japan, as the host nation, received a guaranteed place each in the gender-based combined events, unless a maximum of two men and two women were selected to the team based on competition results.

Tomoa Narasaki and Akiyo Noguchi booked their spots on the host nation's team, with a successful podium finish each (gold for Narasaki and silver for Noguchi) in the men's and women's combined event at the 2019 IFSC World Championships in Hachioji. In November 2019, the International Sport Climbing Association (IFSC) and the Japan Mountaineering and Sport Climbing Association (JMSCA) confirmed Kai Harada and Miho Nonaka as Olympic-qualified sport climbers, occupying a place each reserved for the host nation in their respective events.

Athlete	Event	Qualification									Final								
Athlete	Event	Speed		Boulder		Lead			Total	Rank	Speed		Boulder		Lead			Total	Rank
Athlete	Event	Best	Place	Result	Place	Hold	Time	Place	Total	Rank	Best	Place	Result	Place	Hold	Time	Place	Total	Rank
Kai Harada	Men's	7.08	15	1T2z 4 8	12	25+	–	17	3060.00	18	did not advance								
Tomoa Narasaki	Men's	5.94	2	2T4z 6 7	2	26+	2:11	14	56.00	2 Q	6.02	2	1T3z 1 5	3	33+	–	6	36	4
Akiyo Noguchi	Women's	8.23	9	3T4z 5 4	3	27+	–	6	162.00	4 Q	8.42	4	0T2z 0 7	4	29+	–	4	64	3rd place, bronze medalist(s)
Miho Nonaka	Women's	7.55	4	1T3z 2 3	8	30+	–	3	96.00	3 Q	7.76	3	0T2z 0 5	3	21	–	5	45	2nd place, silver medalist(s)

== Surfing ==
Japan sent four surfers (two men and two women) to compete in their respective shortboard races at the Games. Hiroto Ohhara and Shino Matsuda secured a qualification slot each for their nation, as the highest-ranked at the 2021 ISA World Surfing Games in El Sunzal and La Bocana. Meanwhile, American-born Kanoa Igarashi finished within the top ten of those eligible for qualification in the World Surf League rankings to join Murakami and Matsuda on the host nation's roster.

Athlete	Event	Round 1		Round 2		Round 3	Quarterfinals	Semifinals	Final / BM	
Athlete	Event	Points	Rank	Points	Rank	Opposition Result	Opposition Result	Opposition Result	Opposition Result	Rank
Kanoa Igarashi	Men's shortboard	12.77	1 Q	Bye		Waida (INA); W 14.00–12.00	Andino (USA); W 12.60–11.00	Medina (BRA); W 17.00–16.76	Ferreira (BRA); L 6.60–15.14	2nd place, silver medalist(s)
Hiroto Ohhara	Men's shortboard	11.40	2 Q	Bye		Tudela (PER); W 10.00–9.63	Ferreira (BRA); L 11.90–16.30	Did not advance		
Mahina Maeda	Women's shortboard	9.20	4 q	9.63	3 Q	Marks (USA); L 7.34–15.33	Did not advance			
Amuro Tsuzuki	Women's shortboard	6.99	4 q	11.60	1 Q	Weston-Webb (BRA); W 10.33–9.00	Fitzgibbons (AUS); W 13.27–11.67	Moore (USA); L 7.43–8.33	Marks (USA); W 6.80–4.26	3rd place, bronze medalist(s)

== Swimming ==
Japanese swimmers further achieved qualifying standards in the following events (up to a maximum of 2 swimmers in each event at the Olympic Qualifying Time (OQT), and potentially 1 at the Olympic Selection Time (OST)): To assure their selection to the Olympic team, swimmers must finish in the top two of each individual event under both the federation's required standard and a FINA-A qualifying cut at the Japanese Championships and Olympic Trials (April 3 to 10) in Tokyo.

By winning individual gold medals in the medley double (200 and 400) at the 2019 FINA World Championships, Daiya Seto became the first Japanese swimmer to be directly selected to the Olympic team for Tokyo 2020. Thirty-two more swimmers were named for the home-based Games at the end of the Japanese Championships and Olympic Trials, including backstroke veteran and double silver medalist Ryosuke Irie, leukemia survivor, freestyle, and butterfly sprinter Rikako Ikee, and the reigning Olympic champion in the individual medley Kosuke Hagino. For Irie, he became the third Japanese swimmer to compete in fourth consecutive Olympics, tying the record with Kosuke Kitajima and Takeshi Matsuda for the most appearances.

=== Men ===
Athlete	Event	Heat		Semifinal		Final	
Athlete	Event	Time	Rank	Time	Rank	Time	Rank
Kosuke Hagino	200 m individual medley	1:57.39	=5 Q	1:57.47	6 Q	1:57.49	6
Tomoru Honda	200 m butterfly	1:55.10	6 Q	1:55.31	8 Q	1:53.73	2nd place, silver medalist(s)
Yuki Ikari	400 m individual medley	4:12.08	11	—N/a		Did not advance	
Ryosuke Irie	100 m backstroke	52.99	5 Q	53.21	=9	Did not advance	
Ryosuke Irie	200 m backstroke	1:56.97	8 Q	1:56.69	8 Q	1:57.32	7
Takeshi Kawamoto	100 m butterfly	51.93	20	Did not advance			
Katsuhiro Matsumoto	200 m freestyle	1:46.69	=17	Did not advance			
Taishin Minamide	10 km open water	—N/a				1:53:07.5	13
Naoki Mizunuma	100 m butterfly	51.57	=12 Q	51.46	10	Did not advance	
Ryuya Mura	100 m breaststroke	59.40	11 Q	59.82	=13	Did not advance	
Ryuya Mura	200 m breaststroke	2:09.00	8 Q	2:08.27	6 Q	2:08.42	7
Katsumi Nakamura	100 m freestyle	48.48	17	Did not advance			
Shoma Sato	100 m breaststroke	1:00.04	23	Did not advance			
Shoma Sato	200 m breaststroke	2:09.43	11 Q	2:09.04	10	Did not advance	
Daiya Seto	200 m butterfly	1:55.26	9 Q	1:55.50	11	Did not advance	
Daiya Seto	200 m individual medley	1:58.15	16 Q	1:56.86	3 Q	1:56.22	4
Daiya Seto	400 m individual medley	4:10.52	9	—N/a		Did not advance	
Keita Sunama	200 m backstroke	1:57.07	9 Q	1:57.16	14	Did not advance	
Katsumi Nakamura; Akira Namba; Kaiya Seki; Shinri Shioura	4 × 100 m freestyle relay	3:14.44	14	—N/a		Did not advance	
Kosuke Hagino; Katsuhiro Matsumoto; Kotaro Takahashi; Konosuke Yanagimoto	4 × 200 m freestyle relay	7:09.53	12	—N/a		Did not advance	
Ryosuke Irie; Naoki Mizunuma; Ryuya Mura; Katsumi Nakamura	4 × 100 m medley relay	3:32.02	5 Q	—N/a		3:29.91 AS	6

=== Women ===
Athlete	Event	Heat		Semifinal		Final	
Athlete	Event	Time	Rank	Time	Rank	Time	Rank
Reona Aoki	100 m breaststroke	1:07.29	19	Did not advance			
Suzuka Hasegawa	200 m butterfly	2:10.43	13 Q	2:09.42	9	Did not advance	
Yumi Kida	10 km open water	—N/a				2:01:40.9	13
Waka Kobori	400 m freestyle	4:05.57	11	—N/a		Did not advance	
Waka Kobori	800 m freestyle	8:28.90	16	—N/a		Did not advance	
Anna Konishi	100 m backstroke	1:00.04	16 Q	1:00.07	13	Did not advance	
Miyu Namba	400 m freestyle	4:13.49	20	—N/a		Did not advance	
Miyu Namba	800 m freestyle	8:32.04	17	—N/a		Did not advance	
Yui Ohashi	200 m individual medley	2:10.77	10 Q	2:09.79	5 Q	2:08.52	1st place, gold medalist(s)
Yui Ohashi	400 m individual medley	4:35.71	3 Q	—N/a		4:32.08	1st place, gold medalist(s)
Ageha Tanigawa	400 m individual medley	4:41.76	12	—N/a		Did not advance	
Miho Teramura	200 m individual medley	2:11.22	12 Q	2:12.14	15	Did not advance	
Kanako Watanabe	100 m breaststroke	1:07.01	17	Did not advance			
Kanako Watanabe	200 m breaststroke	2:24.73	18	Did not advance			
Chihiro Igarashi; Rikako Ikee; Rika Omoto; Natsumi Sakai	4 × 100 m freestyle relay	3:36.20	9	—N/a		Did not advance	
Chihiro Igarashi; Nagisa Ikemoto; Aoi Masuda; Rio Shirai	4 × 200 m freestyle relay	7:58.39	9	—N/a		Did not advance	
Chihiro Igarashi; Rikako Ikee; Anna Konishi; Kanako Watanabe	4 × 100 m medley relay	3:57.17	6 Q	—N/a		3:58.12	8

=== Mixed ===
Athlete	Event	Heat		Final	
Athlete	Event	Time	Rank	Time	Rank
Rikako Ikee; Anna Konishi; Katsuhiro Matsumoto; Shoma Sato	4 × 100 m medley relay	3:44.15	9	Did not advance	

== Table tennis ==
Japan entered six athletes into the table tennis competition at the Games, as the host nation was automatically entitled to use quota places each in the men's and women's teams. Moreover, an additional berth was awarded to the Japanese table tennis players competing in the inaugural mixed doubles by advancing to the semifinal stage of the 2019 ITTF World Tour Grand Finals in Zhengzhou.

The host nation's table tennis players were officially named on January 6, 2020, with Rio 2016 bronze medalist Jun Mizutani participating in his fourth straight Games.

=== Men ===
Athlete	Event	Preliminary	Round 1	Round 2	Round 3	Round of 16	Quarterfinals	Semifinals	Final / BM	
Athlete	Event	Opposition Result	Opposition Result	Opposition Result	Opposition Result	Opposition Result	Opposition Result	Opposition Result	Opposition Result	Rank
Tomokazu Harimoto	Singles	Bye			Lam (HKG); W 4–1	Jorgić (SLO); L 3–4	Did not advance			
Koki Niwa	Singles	Bye			Wang (SVK); W 4–0	Ovtcharov (GER); L 1–4	Did not advance			
Tomokazu Harimoto; Jun Mizutani; Koki Niwa	Team	—N/a				Australia; W 3–0	Sweden; W 3–1	Germany; L 2–3	South Korea; W 3–1	3rd place, bronze medalist(s)

=== Women ===
Athlete	Event	Preliminary	Round 1	Round 2	Round 3	Round of 16	Quarterfinals	Semifinals	Final / BM	
Athlete	Event	Opposition Result	Opposition Result	Opposition Result	Opposition Result	Opposition Result	Opposition Result	Opposition Result	Opposition Result	Rank
Kasumi Ishikawa	Singles	Bye			Paranang (THA); W 4–2	Polcanova (AUT); W 4–0	Yu My (SGP); L 1–4	Did not advance		
Mima Ito	Singles	Bye			Yu (POR); W 4–1	Sawettabut (THA); W 4–0	Jeon J-h (KOR); W 4–0	Sun Ys (CHN); L 0–4	Yu My (SGP); W 4–1	3rd place, bronze medalist(s)
Miu Hirano; Kasumi Ishikawa; Mima Ito	Team	—N/a				Hungary; W 3–0	Chinese Taipei; W 3–0	Hong Kong; W 3–0	China; L 0–3	2nd place, silver medalist(s)

=== Mixed ===
Athlete	Event	Round of 16	Quarterfinals	Semifinals	Final / BM	
Athlete	Event	Opposition Result	Opposition Result	Opposition Result	Opposition Result	Rank
Jun Mizutani; Mima Ito	Doubles	Fegerl / Polcanova (AUT); W 4–1	Franziska / Solja (GER); W 4–3	Lin Y-j / Cheng I-c (TPE); W 4–1	Xu X / Liu Sw (CHN); W 4–3	1st place, gold medalist(s)

== Taekwondo ==
As the host nation, Japanese taekwondo practitioners have already received four quota places, two men and two women, at their disposal for the Games. On 9 February 2020, the Japanese Olympic Committee nominated the four athletes to take up the host nation places, with Mayu Hamada (women's 57 kg) leading them to her third consecutive Games.

Athlete	Event	Qualification	Round of 16	Quarterfinals	Semifinals	Repechage 1	Repechage 2	Final / BM	
Athlete	Event	Opposition Result	Opposition Result	Opposition Result	Opposition Result	Opposition Result	Opposition Result	Opposition Result	Rank
Sergio Suzuki	Men's −58 kg	—N/a	Demse (ETH); L 2–22	Did not advance					
Ricardo Suzuki	Men's −68 kg	Bye	Husić (BIH); L 2–22	Did not advance					
Miyu Yamada	Women's −49 kg	Bye	Su P-y (TPE); W 10–9	Sim J-y (KOR); W 16–7	Wongpattanakit (THA); L 12–34 PTG	—N/a	Bye	Bogdanović (SRB); L 6–20	5
Mayu Hamada	Women's −57 kg	Bye	Ben Yessouf (NIG); L 6–11	Did not advance					

== Tennis ==
=== Men ===
Athlete	Event	Round of 64	Round of 32	Round of 16	Quarterfinals	Semifinals	Final / BM	
Athlete	Event	Opposition Score	Opposition Score	Opposition Score	Opposition Score	Opposition Score	Opposition Score	Rank
Taro Daniel	Singles	Sonego (ITA); L 6–4, 6–7^{(6–8)}, 6–7^{(3–7)}	Did not advance					
Kei Nishikori	Singles	Rublev (ROC); W 6–3, 6–4	Giron (USA); W 7–6, 3–6, 6–1	Ivashka (BLR); W 7–6^{(9–7)}, 6–0	Djokovic (SRB); L 2–6, 0–6	Did not advance		
Yoshihito Nishioka	Singles	Khachanov (ROC); L 6–3, 1–6, 2–6	Did not advance					
Yūichi Sugita	Singles	Fognini (ITA); L 4–6, 3–6	Did not advance					
Taro Daniel; Yoshihito Nishioka	Doubles	—N/a	Čilić / Dodig (CRO); L 2–6, 4–6	Did not advance				
Ben McLachlan; Kei Nishikori	Doubles	—N/a	Sousa / Sousa (POR); W 6–1, 6–4	Murray / Skupski (GBR); W 6–3, 6–4	Mektić / Pavić (CRO); L 3–6, 3–6	Did not advance		

=== Women ===
Athlete	Event	Round of 64	Round of 32	Round of 16	Quarterfinals	Semifinals	Final / BM	
Athlete	Event	Opposition Score	Opposition Score	Opposition Score	Opposition Score	Opposition Score	Opposition Score	Rank
Misaki Doi	Singles	Zarazúa (MEX); W 6–3, 6–2	Bencic (SUI); L 2–6, 4–6	Did not advance				
Nao Hibino	Singles	Stojanović (SRB); L 3–6, 3–6	Did not advance					
Naomi Osaka	Singles	Zheng Ss (CHN); W 6–1, 6–4	Golubic (SUI); W 6–3, 6–2	Vondroušová (CZE); L 1–6, 4–6	Did not advance			
Shuko Aoyama; Ena Shibahara	Doubles	—N/a	Bencic / Golubic (SUI); L 4–6, 7–6^{(7–5)}, [5–10]	Did not advance				
Nao Hibino; Makoto Ninomiya	Doubles	—N/a	Barty / Sanders (AUS); L 1–6, 2–6	Did not advance				

=== Mixed ===
Athlete	Event	Round of 16	Quarterfinals	Semifinals	Final / BM	
Athlete	Event	Opposition Score	Opposition Score	Opposition Score	Opposition Score	Rank
Ena Shibahara; Ben McLachlan	Doubles	Shvedova / Golubev (KAZ); W 6–3, 7–6^{(7–3)}	Pavlyuchenkova / Rublev (ROC); L 5–7, 7–6^{(7–0)}, [8–10]	Did not advance		

== Triathlon ==
As the host nation, Japan reserves four quota places with two for each gender in the individual and mixed relay triathlon events.

=== Individual ===
Athlete	Event	Time						Rank
Athlete	Event	Swim (1.5 km)	Trans 1	Bike (40 km)	Trans 2	Run (10 km)	Total	Rank
Kenji Nener	Men's	17:51	0:41	56:31	0:28	30:53	1:46:24	14
Makoto Odakura	Men's	18:21	0:41	56:05	0:30	31:26	1:47:03	19
Niina Kishimoto	Women's	19:48	0:42	Did not finish				
Yuko Takahashi	Women's	19:10	0:42	1:03:15	0:31	37:40	2:01:18	18

=== Relay ===
Athlete	Event	Time						Rank
Athlete	Event	Swim (300 m)	Trans 1	Bike (7 km)	Trans 2	Run (2 km)	Total group	Rank
Kenji Nener	Mixed relay	4:03	0:35	9:36	0:28	5:48	20:30	—N/a
Makoto Odakura	Mixed relay	4:11	0:38	10:19	0:29	6:01	21:38	—N/a
Niina Kishimoto	Mixed relay	4:32	0:39	10:22	0:30	6:54	22:57	—N/a
Yuko Takahashi	Mixed relay	3:52	0:40	10:31	0:28	6:26	21:57	—N/a
Total	Mixed relay	—N/a					1:24:40	6

== Volleyball ==
=== Beach ===
As the host nation, Japan received a guaranteed place for each gender.

Athlete	Event	Preliminary round				Repechage	Round of 16	Quarterfinals	Semifinals	Final / BM	
Athlete	Event	Opposition Score	Opposition Score	Opposition Score	Rank	Opposition Score	Opposition Score	Opposition Score	Opposition Score	Opposition Score	Rank
Yusuke Ishijima; Katsuhiro Shiratori	Men's	Kantor / Łosiak (POL); L(15–21, 14–21)	Lupo / Nicolai (ITA); L (19–21, 16–21)	Thole / Wickler (GER); L (16–21, 11–21)	4	Did not advance					
Miki Ishii; Megumi Murakami	Women's	Hermannová / Sluková (CZE); W (21–0, 21–0)	Kozuch / Ludwig (GER); L (17–21, 20–22)	Betschart / Hüberli (SUI); L (21–14, 19–21, 12–15)	3 q	Baquerizo / Fernández (ESP); L (15–21, 10–21)	Did not advance				

=== Indoor ===
Summary

Team	Event	Group stage						Quarter-finals	Semi-finals	GM / BM	
Team	Event	Opposition Score	Opposition Score	Opposition Score	Opposition Score	Opposition Score	Rank	Opposition Score	Opposition Score	Opposition Score	Rank
Japan men's	Men's tournament	Venezuela; W 3–0	Canada; W 3–1	Italy; L 1–3	Poland; L 0–3	Iran; W 3–2	3 Q	Brazil; L 0–3	Did not advance		
Japan women's	Women's tournament	Kenya; W 3–0	Serbia; L 0–3	Brazil; L 0–3	South Korea; L 2–3	Dominican Republic; L 1–3	5	Did not advance			

==== Men's tournament ====
Japan men's volleyball team automatically qualified for the Olympics as the host nation.

Team roster The Japan roster was announced on 21 June 2021.

Head coach: (Japan) Yuichi Nakagaichi

- 1 Kunihiro Shimizu OP
- 2 Taishi Onodera MB
- 3 Naonobu Fujii S
- 6 Akihiro Yamauchi MB
- 11 Yuji Nishida OP
- 12 Masahiro Sekita S
- 14 Yūki Ishikawa (c) OH
- 15 Haku Ri MB
- 17 Kenta Takanashi OH
- 19 Tatsunori Otsuka OH
- 20 Tomohiro Yamamoto L
- 21 Ran Takahashi OH

Group play

Pos	Team	Pld	W	L	Pts	SW	SL	SR	SPW	SPL	SPR	Qualification
1	Poland	5	4	1	13	14	4	3.500	435	365	1.192	Quarterfinals
2	Italy	5	4	1	11	12	7	1.714	447	411	1.088	Quarterfinals
3	Japan (H)	5	3	2	8	10	9	1.111	437	433	1.009	Quarterfinals
4	Canada	5	2	3	7	9	9	1.000	396	387	1.023	Quarterfinals
5	Iran	5	2	3	6	9	11	0.818	453	460	0.985	
6	Venezuela	5	0	5	0	1	15	0.067	281	393	0.715	

Source: Tokyo 2020 and FIVB
Rules for classification: Tiebreakers
(H) Host

24 July 2021; 17:05 v	Japan	3–0	Venezuela	Ariake Arena, Tokyo; Referees: Luis Macias (MEX), Vladimir Simonovic (SRB)
24 July 2021; 17:05 v	(25–21, 25–20, 25–15); Results Statistics			Ariake Arena, Tokyo; Referees: Luis Macias (MEX), Vladimir Simonovic (SRB)

26 July 2021; 19:40 v	Japan	3–1	Canada	Ariake Arena, Tokyo; Referees: Daniele Rapisarda (ITA), Patricia Rolf (USA)
26 July 2021; 19:40 v	(23–25, 25–23, 25–23, 25–20); Results Statistics			Ariake Arena, Tokyo; Referees: Daniele Rapisarda (ITA), Patricia Rolf (USA)

28 July 2021; 19:40 v	Japan	1–3	Italy	Ariake Arena, Tokyo; Referees: Juraj Mokrý (SVK), Fabrice Collados (FRA)
28 July 2021; 19:40 v	(20–25, 17–25, 25–23, 21–25); Results Statistics			Ariake Arena, Tokyo; Referees: Juraj Mokrý (SVK), Fabrice Collados (FRA)

30 July 2021; 14:20 v	Japan	0–3	Poland	Ariake Arena, Tokyo; Referees: Hernán Casamiquela (ARG), Liu Jiang (CHN)
30 July 2021; 14:20 v	(22–25, 21–25, 24–26); Results Statistics			Ariake Arena, Tokyo; Referees: Hernán Casamiquela (ARG), Liu Jiang (CHN)

1 August 2021; 19:40 v	Japan	3–2	Iran	Ariake Arena, Tokyo; Referees: Juraj Mokrý (SVK), Daniele Rapisarda (ITA)
1 August 2021; 19:40 v	(25–21, 20–25, 29–31, 25–22, 15–13); Results Statistics			Ariake Arena, Tokyo; Referees: Juraj Mokrý (SVK), Daniele Rapisarda (ITA)

Quarterfinal

3 August 2021; 13:00 v	Japan	0–3	Brazil	Ariake Arena, Tokyo; Referees: Denny Cespedes (DOM), Liu Jiang (CHN)
3 August 2021; 13:00 v	(20–25, 22–25, 20–25); Results Statistics			Ariake Arena, Tokyo; Referees: Denny Cespedes (DOM), Liu Jiang (CHN)

==== Women's tournament ====
Japan women's volleyball team automatically qualified for the Olympics as the host nation.

Team roster The Japan roster was announced 30 June 2021.

Head coach: Kumi Nakada

- 1 Ai Kurogo OS
- 2 Sarina Koga OS
- 3 Kanami Tashiro S
- 4 Mayu Ishikawa OS
- 5 Haruyo Shimamura MB
- 6 Mako Kobata L
- 8 Yuki Ishii OS
- 9 Mai Okumura MB
- 11 Erika Araki (c) MB
- 12 Aki Momii S
- 15 Kotona Hayashi OS
- 19 Nichika Yamada MB

Group play

Pos	Team	Pld	W	L	Pts	SW	SL	SR	SPW	SPL	SPR	Qualification
1	Brazil	5	5	0	14	15	3	5.000	434	315	1.378	Quarter-finals
2	Serbia	5	4	1	12	13	3	4.333	381	313	1.217	Quarter-finals
3	South Korea	5	3	2	7	9	10	0.900	374	415	0.901	Quarter-finals
4	Dominican Republic	5	2	3	8	10	10	1.000	411	406	1.012	Quarter-finals
5	Japan (H)	5	1	4	4	6	12	0.500	378	395	0.957	
6	Kenya	5	0	5	0	0	15	0.000	242	376	0.644	

Source: Tokyo 2020 and FIVB
Rules for classification: Tiebreakers
(H) Host

25 July 2021; 19:40	Japan	3–0	Kenya	Ariake Arena, Tokyo; Referees: Fabrice Collados (FRA), Hamid Al-Rousi (UAE)
25 July 2021; 19:40	(25–15, 25–11, 25–23); Results Statistics			Ariake Arena, Tokyo; Referees: Fabrice Collados (FRA), Hamid Al-Rousi (UAE)

27 July 2021; 14:20	Japan	0–3	Serbia	Ariake Arena, Tokyo; Referees: Patricia Rolf (USA), Juraj Mokrý (SVK)
27 July 2021; 14:20	(23–25, 16–25, 24–26); Results Statistics			Ariake Arena, Tokyo; Referees: Patricia Rolf (USA), Juraj Mokrý (SVK)

29 July 2021; 19:40	Japan	0–3	Brazil	Ariake Arena, Tokyo; Referees: Denny Cespedes (DOM), Evgeny Makshanov (RUS)
29 July 2021; 19:40	(16–25, 18–25, 24–26); Results Statistics			Ariake Arena, Tokyo; Referees: Denny Cespedes (DOM), Evgeny Makshanov (RUS)

31 July 2021; 19:40	Japan	2–3	South Korea	Ariake Arena, Tokyo; Referees: Susana Rodríguez (ESP), Paulo Turci (BRA)
31 July 2021; 19:40	(19–25, 25–19, 22–25, 25–15, 14–16); Results Statistics			Ariake Arena, Tokyo; Referees: Susana Rodríguez (ESP), Paulo Turci (BRA)

2 August 2021; 19:40	Japan	1–3	Dominican Republic	Ariake Arena, Tokyo; Referees: Patricia Rolf (USA), Wojciech Maroszek (POL)
2 August 2021; 19:40	(10–25, 23–25, 25–19, 19–25); Results Statistics			Ariake Arena, Tokyo; Referees: Patricia Rolf (USA), Wojciech Maroszek (POL)

== Water polo ==
Summary

Key:
- FT – After full time.
- P – Match decided by penalty-shootout.

Team	Event	Group stage						Quarter-finals	Semi-finals	GM / BM	
Team	Event	Opposition Score	Opposition Score	Opposition Score	Opposition Score	Opposition Score	Rank	Opposition Score	Opposition Score	Opposition Score	Rank
Japan men's	Men's tournament	United States; L 13–15	Hungary; L 11–16	Greece; L 9–10	Italy; L 8–16	South Africa; W 24–9	5	Did not advance			
Japan women's	Women's tournament	United States; L 4–25	China; L 11–16	Hungary; L 13–17	Russia; L 16–20	—N/a	5	Did not advance			

=== Men's tournament ===
Japan men's water polo team automatically qualified for the Olympics as the host nation.

Team roster Japan's final squad was announced on 19 May 2021.

Head coach: Yoji Omoto

No.	Player	Pos.	L/R	Height	Weight	Date of birth (age)	Apps	OG/ Goals	Club	Ref
1	Katsuyuki Tanamura	GK	R	1.83 m (6 ft 0 in)	86 kg (190 lb)	3 August 1989 (aged 31)	142	1/0	(Japan) Bourbon	
2	Seiya Adachi	D	R	1.72 m (5 ft 8 in)	76 kg (168 lb)	24 June 1995 (aged 26)	48	1/1	(Romania) CSM Digi Oradea	
3	Harukiirario Koppu	CB	R	1.84 m (6 ft 0 in)	84 kg (185 lb)	28 December 1998 (aged 22)	141	0/0	(Japan) DSK Dragons	
4	Mitsuaki Shiga	D	R	1.77 m (5 ft 10 in)	76 kg (168 lb)	16 September 1991 (aged 29)	136	1/3	(Japan) Kingfisher74	
5	Takuma Yoshida	D	R	1.75 m (5 ft 9 in)	77 kg (170 lb)	11 October 1994 (aged 26)	122	0/0	(Japan) Kingfisher74	
6	Toi Suzuki	D	R	1.83 m (6 ft 0 in)	78 kg (172 lb)	20 October 1999 (aged 21)	112	0/0	(Japan) Nippon Sport	
7	Yusuke Shimizu	CF	L	1.81 m (5 ft 11 in)	95 kg (209 lb)	7 September 1988 (aged 32)		1/1	(Japan) Bourbon	
8	Mitsuru Takata	D	R	1.82 m (6 ft 0 in)	86 kg (190 lb)	8 December 1995 (aged 25)	72	0/0	(Japan) Kingfisher74	
9	Atsushi Arai	D	R	1.68 m (5 ft 6 in)	66 kg (146 lb)	3 February 1994 (aged 27)	18	1/4	(Japan) Kingfisher74	
10	Yusuke Inaba	D	R	1.80 m (5 ft 11 in)	79 kg (174 lb)	11 April 2000 (aged 21)	42	0/0	(Japan) Bourbon	
11	Keigo Okawa (C)	D	R	1.83 m (6 ft 0 in)	90 kg (198 lb)	11 March 1990 (aged 31)	118	1/9	(Japan) Kingfisher74	
12	Kenta Araki	CF	R	1.86 m (6 ft 1 in)	94 kg (207 lb)	6 April 1995 (aged 26)	18	0/0	(Japan) Kingfisher74	
13	Tomoyoshi Fukushima	GK	R	1.78 m (5 ft 10 in)	80 kg (176 lb)	3 June 1993 (aged 28)	112	1/0	(Japan) Kingfisher74	
Average				1.79 m (5 ft 10 in)	82 kg (181 lb)	27 years, 29 days	90			

Note: Age as of 23 July 2021
Source: Japan Men | Tokyo 2020 Olympics Archived 2021-07-22 at the Wayback Machine

Group play

Pos	Team	Pld	W	D	L	GF	GA	GD	Pts	Qualification
1	Greece	5	4	1	0	68	34	+34	9	Quarterfinals
2	Italy	5	3	2	0	60	32	+28	8	Quarterfinals
3	Hungary	5	3	1	1	64	35	+29	7	Quarterfinals
4	United States	5	2	0	3	59	53	+6	4	Quarterfinals
5	Japan (H)	5	1	0	4	65	66	−1	2	
6	South Africa	5	0	0	5	20	116	−96	0	

Source: Tokyo 2020 and FINA
Rules for classification: 1) Points; 2) Head-to-head points; 3) Head-to-head goal difference; 4) Head-to-head goals scored; 5) Goal difference.
(H) Hosts

25 July 2021; 14:00 v	Report	United States	15–13	Japan	Tokyo Tatsumi International Swimming Center; Referees: Sébastien Dervieux (FRA), Arkadiy Voevodin (RUS)
25 July 2021; 14:00 v	Report	Score by quarters: 3–3, 4–5, 4–2, 4–3			Tokyo Tatsumi International Swimming Center; Referees: Sébastien Dervieux (FRA), Arkadiy Voevodin (RUS)
25 July 2021; 14:00 v	Report	Bowen 5	Goals	three players 3	Tokyo Tatsumi International Swimming Center; Referees: Sébastien Dervieux (FRA), Arkadiy Voevodin (RUS)

27 July 2021; 18:20 v	Report	Japan	11–16	Hungary	Tokyo Tatsumi International Swimming Center; Referees: Michiel Zwart (NED), Nenad Periš (CRO)
27 July 2021; 18:20 v	Report	Score by quarters: 3–4, 5–4, 2–5, 1–3			Tokyo Tatsumi International Swimming Center; Referees: Michiel Zwart (NED), Nenad Periš (CRO)
27 July 2021; 18:20 v	Report	Inaba, Okawa 3	Goals	Zalánki 4	Tokyo Tatsumi International Swimming Center; Referees: Michiel Zwart (NED), Nenad Periš (CRO)

29 July 2021; 18:20 v	Report	Greece	10–9	Japan	Tokyo Tatsumi International Swimming Center; Referees: Adrian Alexandrescu (ROU), Vojin Putniković (SRB)
29 July 2021; 18:20 v	Report	Score by quarters: 1–1, 4–4, 2–1, 3–3			Tokyo Tatsumi International Swimming Center; Referees: Adrian Alexandrescu (ROU), Vojin Putniković (SRB)
29 July 2021; 18:20 v	Report	Kapotsis, Genidounias 3	Goals	Adachi 3	Tokyo Tatsumi International Swimming Center; Referees: Adrian Alexandrescu (ROU), Vojin Putniković (SRB)

31 July 2021; 18:20 v	Report	Italy	16–8	Japan	Tokyo Tatsumi International Swimming Center; Referees: Stanko Ivanovski (MNE), Nenad Periš (CRO)
31 July 2021; 18:20 v	Report	Score by quarters: 5–0, 3–3, 3–1, 5–4			Tokyo Tatsumi International Swimming Center; Referees: Stanko Ivanovski (MNE), Nenad Periš (CRO)
31 July 2021; 18:20 v	Report	Bodagas, Figlioli 3	Goals	Inaba 3	Tokyo Tatsumi International Swimming Center; Referees: Stanko Ivanovski (MNE), Nenad Periš (CRO)

2 August 2021; 18:20 v	Report	Japan	24–9	South Africa	Tokyo Tatsumi International Swimming Center; Referees: John Waldow (NZL), Vojin Putniković (SRB)
2 August 2021; 18:20 v	Report	Score by quarters: 5–4, 7–4, 6–1, 6–0			Tokyo Tatsumi International Swimming Center; Referees: John Waldow (NZL), Vojin Putniković (SRB)
2 August 2021; 18:20 v	Report	Adachi, Arai 4	Goals	Neill 4	Tokyo Tatsumi International Swimming Center; Referees: John Waldow (NZL), Vojin Putniković (SRB)

=== Women's tournament ===
Japan women's water polo team automatically qualified for the Olympics as the host nation.

Team roster Japan's final squad was announced on 19 May 2021.

Head coach: Makihiro Motomiya

No.	Player	Pos.	L/R	Height	Weight	Date of birth (age)	Apps	OG/ Goals	Club	Ref
1	Rikako Miura	GK	R	1.71 m (5 ft 7 in)	61 kg (134 lb)	13 October 1989 (aged 31)	76	0/0	(Japan) Nittai Club	
2	Yumi Arima	D	R	1.73 m (5 ft 8 in)	73 kg (161 lb)	9 September 1997 (aged 23)	45	0/0	(Japan) Fujimura	
3	Akari Inaba	D	R	1.64 m (5 ft 5 in)	60 kg (132 lb)	2 February 1998 (aged 23)	50	0/0	(Japan) Shumei University	
4	Eruna Ura	D	R	1.69 m (5 ft 7 in)	61 kg (134 lb)	14 October 2002 (aged 18)	8	0/0	(Japan) Shumei University	
5	Kaho Iwano	CB	R	1.66 m (5 ft 5 in)	62 kg (137 lb)	6 August 1999 (aged 21)	6	0/0	(Japan) Shumei University	
6	Miku Koide	CF	R	1.72 m (5 ft 8 in)	78 kg (172 lb)	21 May 1992 (aged 29)	33	0/0	(Japan) Bourbon	
7	Maiko Hashida	D	R	1.64 m (5 ft 5 in)	58 kg (128 lb)	23 December 2000 (aged 20)	28	0/0	(Japan) Nippon Sport	
8	Yuki Niizawa (C)	D	L	1.59 m (5 ft 3 in)	56 kg (123 lb)	13 February 1997 (aged 24)	51	0/0	(Japan) Nittai Club	
9	Minori Yamamoto	D	R	1.56 m (5 ft 1 in)	80 kg (176 lb)	14 October 1997 (aged 23)	45	0/0	(Japan) Shumei University	
10	Kako Kawaguchi	D	L	1.59 m (5 ft 3 in)	56 kg (123 lb)	14 July 1999 (aged 22)	6	0/0	(Japan) Nippon Sport	
11	Marina Tokumoto	CB	R	1.64 m (5 ft 5 in)	60 kg (132 lb)	2 February 1996 (aged 25)	65	0/0	(Japan) Toeikai	
12	Kyoko Kudo	D	R	1.65 m (5 ft 5 in)	56 kg (123 lb)	10 February 2001 (aged 20)	6	0/0	(Japan) Nippon Sport	
13	Minami Shioya	GK	R	1.73 m (5 ft 8 in)	68 kg (150 lb)	27 July 1997 (aged 23)	51	0/0	(Japan) Shumei University	
Average				1.66 m (5 ft 5 in)	64 kg (141 lb)	23 years, 302 days	36			

Note: Age as of 23 July 2021
Source: Japan Women | Tokyo 2020 Olympics Archived 2021-07-22 at the Wayback Machine

Group play

Pos	Team	Pld	W	D	L	GF	GA	GD	Pts	Qualification
1	United States	4	3	0	1	64	26	+38	6	Quarterfinals
2	Hungary	4	2	1	1	46	43	+3	5 (Note: ROC10–10 Hungary)	Quarterfinals
3	ROC	4	2	1	1	53	61	−8	5	Quarterfinals
4	China	4	2	0	2	51	50	+1	4	Quarterfinals
5	Japan (H)	4	0	0	4	44	78	−34	0	

Source: Tokyo 2020 and FINA
Rules for classification: 1) Points; 2) Head-to-head points; 3) Head-to-head goal difference; 4) Head-to-head goals scored; 5) Goal difference.
(H) Hosts
Notes:

24 July 2021; 14:00 v	Report	Japan	4–25	United States	Tokyo Tatsumi International Swimming Center; Referees: Germán Moller (ARG), Nicola Johnson (AUS)
24 July 2021; 14:00 v	Report	Score by quarters: 3–8, 0–6, 1–7, 0–4			Tokyo Tatsumi International Swimming Center; Referees: Germán Moller (ARG), Nicola Johnson (AUS)
24 July 2021; 14:00 v	Report	Koide 2	Goals	Haralabidis, Steffens 5	Tokyo Tatsumi International Swimming Center; Referees: Germán Moller (ARG), Nicola Johnson (AUS)

28 July 2021; 18:20 v	Report	China	16–11	Japan	Tokyo Tatsumi International Swimming Center; Referees: Marie-Claude Deslières (CAN), Viktor Salnichenko (KAZ)
28 July 2021; 18:20 v	Report	Score by quarters: 5–2, 4–3, 4–3, 3–3			Tokyo Tatsumi International Swimming Center; Referees: Marie-Claude Deslières (CAN), Viktor Salnichenko (KAZ)
28 July 2021; 18:20 v	Report	Zhang 5	Goals	Arima 3	Tokyo Tatsumi International Swimming Center; Referees: Marie-Claude Deslières (CAN), Viktor Salnichenko (KAZ)

30 July 2021; 18:20 v	Report	Japan	13–17	Hungary	Tokyo Tatsumi International Swimming Center; Referees: Adrian Alexandrescu (ROU), Vojin Putniković (SRB)
30 July 2021; 18:20 v	Report	Score by quarters: 4–3, 3–4, 3–5, 3–5			Tokyo Tatsumi International Swimming Center; Referees: Adrian Alexandrescu (ROU), Vojin Putniković (SRB)
30 July 2021; 18:20 v	Report	Arima, Inaba 4	Goals	Parkes 6	Tokyo Tatsumi International Swimming Center; Referees: Adrian Alexandrescu (ROU), Vojin Putniković (SRB)

1 August 2021; 18:20 v	Report	ROC	20–16	Japan	Tokyo Tatsumi International Swimming Center; Referees: Marie-Claude Deslières (CAN), Dion Willis (RSA)
1 August 2021; 18:20 v	Report	Score by quarters: 5–5, 7–3, 6–4, 2–4			Tokyo Tatsumi International Swimming Center; Referees: Marie-Claude Deslières (CAN), Dion Willis (RSA)
1 August 2021; 18:20 v	Report	Serzhantova 4	Goals	Arima 5	Tokyo Tatsumi International Swimming Center; Referees: Marie-Claude Deslières (CAN), Dion Willis (RSA)

== Weightlifting ==
Japanese weightlifters qualified for four quota places at the games, based on the Tokyo 2020 Rankings Qualification List of 11 June 2021 and three quotas from Host Nation Quotas.

=== Men ===
Athlete	Event	Snatch		Clean & jerk		Total	Rank
Athlete	Event	Result	Rank	Result	Rank	Total	Rank
Yoichi Itokazu	−61 kg	133	3	159	5	292	4
Mitsunori Konnai	−67 kg	135	11	172	6	307	7
Masanori Miyamoto	−73 kg	147	8	188	5	335	7
Toshiki Yamamoto	−96 kg	168	7	~~200~~	DNF	168	DNF

=== Women ===
Athlete	Event	Snatch		Clean & jerk		Total	Rank
Athlete	Event	Result	Rank	Result	Rank	Total	Rank
Hiromi Miyake	−49 kg	74	11	~~99~~	DNF	74	DNF
Kanae Yagi	−55 kg	81	13	102	10	183	11
Mikiko Andoh	−59 kg	94	6	120	3	214	3rd place, bronze medalist(s)

== Wrestling ==
Japan qualified twelve wrestlers for each of the following classes into the Olympic competition. Eight of them finished among the top six to book Olympic spots in the men's freestyle (65 and 74 kg), men's Greco-Roman 60 kg and women's freestyle wrestling (53, 57, 62, 68, and 76 kg) at the 2019 World Championships, while two additional licenses were awarded to the Japanese wrestlers, who progressed to the top two finals of the men's Greco-Roman 77 kg and women's freestyle 50 kg, respectively, at the 2021 Asian Qualification Tournament in Almaty, Kazakhstan. Two Japanese wrestlers claimed one of the remaining slots each in the men's freestyle 57 and 86 kg, respectively, to complete the host nation's roster at the 2021 World Qualification Tournament in Sofia, Bulgaria.

Key:

- VT (ranking points: 5–0 or 0–5) – Victory by fall.
- VB (ranking points: 5–0 or 0–5) – Victory by injury (VF for forfeit, VA for withdrawal or disqualification)
- PP (ranking points: 3–1 or 1–3) – Decision by points – the loser with technical points.
- PO (ranking points: 3–0 or 0–3) – Decision by points – the loser without technical points.
- ST (ranking points: 4–0 or 0–4) – Great superiority – the loser without technical points and a margin of victory of at least 8 (Greco-Roman) or 10 (freestyle) points.
- SP (ranking points: 4–1 or 1–4) – Technical superiority – the loser with technical points and a margin of victory of at least 8 (Greco-Roman) or 10 (freestyle) points.

Freestyle

Athlete	Event	Round of 16	Quarterfinals	Semifinals	Repechage	Final / BM	
Athlete	Event	Opposition Result	Opposition Result	Opposition Result	Opposition Result	Opposition Result	Rank
Yuki Takahashi	Men's −57 kg	Mićić (SRB); W 3–0 ^{PO}	Sanayev (KAZ); L 1–3 ^{PP}	Did not advance			8
Takuto Otoguro	Men's −65 kg	Tömör-Ochir (MGL); W 3–1 ^{PP}	Muszukajev (HUN); W 3–1 ^{PP}	Rashidov (ROC); W 3–1 ^{PP}	Bye	Aliyev (AZE); W 3–1 ^{PP}	1st place, gold medalist(s)
Keisuke Otoguro	Men's −74 kg	Kaisanov (KAZ); L 0–5 ^{VT}	Did not advance				14
Sohsuke Takatani	Men's −86 kg	Göçen (TUR); L 1–3 ^{PP}	Did not advance				9
Yui Susaki	Women's −50 kg	Tsogt-Ochir (MGL); W 4–0 ^{ST}	Yépez (ECU); W 4–0 ^{ST}	Stadnik (AZE); W 4–0 ^{ST}	Bye	Sun Yn (CHN); W 4–0 ^{ST}	1st place, gold medalist(s)
Mayu Mukaida	Women's −53 kg	Essombe (CMR); W 4–0 ^{ST}	Zasina (POL); W 4–1 ^{SP}	Bat-Ochir (MGL); W 3–1 ^{PP}	Bye	Pang Qy (CHN); W 3–1 ^{PP}	1st place, gold medalist(s)
Risako Kawai	Women's −57 kg	Camara (GUI); W 3–1 ^{PP}	Boldsaikhan (MGL); W 3–0 ^{PO}	Maroulis (USA); W 3–1 ^{PP}	Bye	Kurachkina (BLR); W 3–0 ^{PO}	1st place, gold medalist(s)
Yukako Kawai	Women's −62 kg	Ovcharova (ROC); W 4–0 ^{ST}	Johansson (SWE); W 3–1 ^{PP}	Yusein (BUL); W 3–1 ^{PP}	Bye	Tynybekova (KGZ); W 3–1 ^{PP}	1st place, gold medalist(s)
Sara Dosho	Women's −68 kg	Mensah (USA); L 0–4 ^{ST}	Did not advance		Zhou F (CHN); W 3–1 ^{PP}	Cherkasova (UKR); L 0–5 ^{VT}	5
Hiroe Minagawa	Women's −76 kg	Ochirbat (MGL); W 3–0 ^{PO}	Mäe (EST); W 3–0 ^{PO}	Rotter-Focken (GER); L 1–3 ^{PP}	Bye	Zhou Q (CHN); L 0–5 ^{VT}	5

Greco-Roman

Athlete	Event	Round of 16	Quarterfinals	Semifinals	Repechage	Final / BM	
Athlete	Event	Opposition Result	Opposition Result	Opposition Result	Opposition Result	Opposition Result	Rank
Kenichiro Fumita	Men's −60 kg	Fergat (ALG); W 4–0 ^{ST}	Walihan (CHN); W 3–1 ^{PP}	Temirov (UKR); W 3–1 ^{PP}	Bye	Orta (CUB); L 1–3 ^{PP}	2nd place, silver medalist(s)
Shohei Yabiku	Men's −77 kg	Zhadrayev (KAZ); W 3–1 ^{PP}	Lőrincz (HUN); L 1–3 ^{PP}	Did not advance	Ayet Ikram (MAR); W 5–0 ^{VB}	Ali Geraei (IRI); W 4–1 ^{SP}	3rd place, bronze medalist(s)

== See also ==
- Japan at the 2020 Summer Paralympics
