= Surfing at the 2020 Summer Olympics – Women's shortboard =

Women's shortboard at the Games of the XXXII Olympiad
- Olympic surfing
- Venue: Shidashita Beach, Chiba
- Dates: 25–27 July 2021
- Competitors: 20 from 12 nations
- Winning score: 14.93

Medalists
1st place, gold medalist(s)		Carissa Moore	United States
2nd place, silver medalist(s)		Bianca Buitendag	South Africa
3rd place, bronze medalist(s)		Amuro Tsuzuki	Japan

The women's shortboard competition at the 2020 Summer Olympics in Tokyo was held from 25 to 27 July at the Shidashita Beach, or "Shida", located about 40 miles (64 km) outside of Tokyo in Chiba.

The medals for the competition were presented by Bernard Rajzman, IOC Member, one Olympian, and Silver Medalist, Brazil; and the medalists' bouquets were presented by Fernando Aguerre, ISA President; United States.

== Background ==
This was the first time the surfing is held at the Olympics; it was one of five temporary sports selected for Tokyo 2020. Surfing has also been selected as a temporary sport for 2024 Summer Olympics in Paris, France.

== Qualification ==
Quota places were allocated to the athletes at the following events:

- Host Country: Japan as host country is allocated 1 place in both men's and women's events. If at least one Japanese surfer has earned a qualification place through other events, the relevant Host Country Place(s) shall be reallocated to the next highest ranked eligible athlete at the 2020 World Surfing Games.
- 2019 World Surf League Championship Tour – the 10 highest ranked men and 8 highest ranked women will be awarded quota places.
- 2019 ISA World Surfing Games – the top finishers from each continent with the exception of the Americas will be awarded a quota place.
- 2019 Pan American Games – the top finisher in men's and women's events will be awarded a quota place.
- 2021 ISA World Surfing Games – the top 4 men and 6 women will be awarded quota places. If a NOC or National Olympic Committee qualifies more than the maximum number of athletes, the 2021 ISA World Surfing Games will prevail and any places earned from 2019 will be reawarded to the next highest finishing athlete(s).

There is a maximum of 2 men and 2 women per NOC.

== Competition format ==
The competition consists of six rounds:

- Round 1: 5 heats of 4 surfers each; the top 2 in each heat (10 total) advance to round 3 while the other 2 from each heat (10 total) go to round 2 (essentially a repechage)
- Round 2: 2 heats of 5 surfers each; the top 3 in each heat (6 total) advance to round 3 while the other 2 in each heat (4 total) are eliminated
- Round 3: Head-to-head competition starts with this round of 16 (8 heats of 2 surfers each; winner advances, loser eliminated)
- Quarterfinals
- Semifinals
- Final and bronze medal match

The length of each heat (20 to 35 minutes) and the maximum number of waves each surfer can ride are determined by the technical director ahead of the day of competition. Scoring for each wave is from 0 to 10, with the best two waves for each surfer counting. Scores are based on the difficulty of manoeuvres performed, innovation and progression, variety, combination, speed, power, and flow of each manoeuvre.

== Schedule ==
H	Heats	QF	Quarter-Finals	SF	Semi-Finals	F	Finals

Schedule
Date	25 Jul		26 Jul	27 Jul		
Men's	R1	R2	R3	QF	SF	F
Women's	R1	R2	R3	QF	SF	F

Competition took place over 3 days between 25 July and 27 July. Due to a tropical storm the inaugural Olympic surfing finals were moved from Thursday 29 July to Tuesday 27 July.

== Results ==
=== Round 1 ===
The first round is non-elimination. Surfers are seeded into five heats of four surfers each, with the top two surfers advancing straight to Round 3. The bottom two surfers are seeded into Round 2, the first elimination round.

==== Heat 1 ====
Rank	Surfer	Nation	Total score	Notes
1	Carissa Moore	United States	11.74	R3
2	Teresa Bonvalot	Portugal	9.80	R3
3	Dominic Barona	Ecuador	7.66	R2
4	Daniella Rosas	Peru	7.50	R2

==== Heat 2 ====
Rank	Surfer	Nation	Total score	Notes
1	Sally Fitzgibbons	Australia	12.50	R3
2	Brisa Hennessy	Costa Rica	12.20	R3
3	Bianca Buitendag	South Africa	11.44	R2
4	Mahina Maeda	Japan	9.20	R2

==== Heat 3 ====
Rank	Surfer	Nation	Total score	Notes
1	Stephanie Gilmore	Australia	14.50	R3
2	Silvana Lima	Brazil	12.13	R3
3	Pauline Ado	France	9.17	R2
4	Anat Lelior	Israel	7.77	R2

==== Heat 4 ====
Rank	Surfer	Nation	Total score	Notes
1	Tatiana Weston-Webb	Brazil	11.33	R3
2	Johanne Defay	France	10.60	R3
3	Sofía Mulánovich	Peru	7.80	R2
4	Amuro Tsuzuki	Japan	6.99	R2

==== Heat 5 ====
Rank	Surfer	Nation	Total score	Notes
1	Caroline Marks	United States	13.40	R3
2	Ella Williams	New Zealand	9.70	R3
3	Leilani McGonagle	Costa Rica	9.64	R2
4	Yolanda Hopkins	Portugal	9.24	R2

=== Round 2 ===
The top three surfers from each heat in Round 2 advance to Round 3. The bottom two surfers from each heat are eliminated.

==== Heat 1 ====
Rank	Surfer	Nation	Total score	Notes
1	Amuro Tsuzuki	Japan	11.60	R3
2	Bianca Buitendag	South Africa	10.40	R3
3	Mahina Maeda	Japan	9.63	R3
4	Leilani McGonagle	Costa Rica	9.63	E
5	Dominic Barona	Ecuador	8.87	E

==== Heat 2 ====
Rank	Surfer	Nation	Total score	Notes
1	Yolanda Hopkins	Portugal	12.23	R3
2	Pauline Ado	France	9.66	R3
3	Sofía Mulánovich	Peru	9.36	R3
4	Anat Lelior	Israel	8.93	E
5	Daniella Rosas	Peru	8.14	E

=== Round 3 ===
The winner from each head-to-head heat qualifies to the next round.

3rd round
Stephanie Gilmore (AUS)	10.00
Bianca Buitendag (RSA)	13.93
Johanne Defay (FRA)	9.40
Yolanda Hopkins (POR)	10.84
Brisa Hennessy (CRC)	12.00
Ella Williams (NZL)	7.73
Caroline Marks (USA)	15.33
Mahina Maeda (JPN)	7.74
Carissa Moore (USA)	10.34
Sofía Mulánovich (PER)	9.90
Silvana Lima (BRA)	12.17
Teresa Bonvalot (POR)	7.50
Tatiana Weston-Webb (BRA)	9.00
Amuro Tsuzuki (JPN)	10.33
Sally Fitzgibbons (AUS)	10.86
Pauline Ado (FRA)	9.03

Quarter finals
Bianca Buitendag (RSA)	9.50
Yolanda Hopkins (POR)	5.46
Brisa Hennessy (CRC)	6.83
Caroline Marks (USA)	12.50
Carissa Moore (USA)	14.26
Silvana Lima (BRA)	8.30
Amuro Tsuzuki (JPN)	13.27
Sally Fitzgibbons (AUS)	11.67

Semifinals
Bianca Buitendag (RSA)	11.00
Caroline Marks (USA)	3.67
Carissa Moore (USA)	8.33
Amuro Tsuzuki (JPN)	7.43

Finals
(silver) Bianca Buitendag (RSA)	8.46
(gold) Carissa Moore (USA)	14.93
Bronze medal match
Caroline Marks (USA)	4.26
(bronze) Amuro Tsuzuki (JPN)	6.80
