= Portugal at the 2020 Summer Olympics =

- IOC code: POR
- NOC: Olympic Committee of Portugal
- Website: www.comiteolimpicoportugal.pt (in Portuguese)

in Tokyo, Japan July 23, 2021 – August 8, 2021
- Competitors: 92 in 17 sports
- Flag bearers (opening): Telma Monteiro; Nelson Évora
- Flag bearer (closing): Pedro Pichardo
- Medals Ranked 56th: Gold 1 Silver 1 Bronze 2 Total 4

Summer Olympics appearances (overview)
- 1912; 1920; 1924; 1928; 1932; 1936; 1948; 1952; 1956; 1960; 1964; 1968; 1972; 1976; 1980; 1984; 1988; 1992; 1996; 2000; 2004; 2008; 2012; 2016; 2020; 2024; 2028

Portugal competed at the 2020 Summer Olympics in Tokyo, from 23 July to 8 August 2021. Originally scheduled to take place from 24 July to 9 August 2020, the Games were postponed because of the COVID-19 pandemic. Portuguese athletes have appeared in every edition of the Summer Olympic Games since the nation's debut in 1912.

These were the most successful Olympic Games for Portugal as its delegation won a total of four medals, surpassing the three medals of Los Angeles 1984 and Athens 2004. For the first time ever, Portugal won at least one medal of each kind and reached the podium in more than two sports in the same Games.

== Medalists ==
Medal	Name	Sport	Event	Date
Gold	Pedro Pichardo	Athletics	Men's triple jump	5 August
Silver	Patrícia Mamona	Athletics	Women's triple jump	1 August
Bronze	Jorge Fonseca	Judo	Men's 100 kg	29 July
Bronze	Fernando Pimenta	Canoeing	Men's K-1 1000 metres	3 August

== Competitors ==
The following is the list of number of competitors participating in the Games:

Sport	Men	Women	Total
Athletics	7	13	20
Canoeing	6	2	8
Cycling	2	2	4
Equestrian	2	2	4
Gymnastics	1	1	2
Handball	14	0	14
Judo	2	6	8
Rowing	2	0	2
Sailing	4	1	5
Shooting	1	0	1
Skateboarding	1	0	1
Surfing	1	2	3
Swimming	5	4	9
Table tennis	3	2	5
Taekwondo	1	0	1
Tennis	2	0	2
Triathlon	2	1	3
Total	56	36	92

== Athletics ==
Portuguese athletes further achieved the entry standards, either by qualifying time or by world ranking, in the following track and field events (up to a maximum of 3 athletes in each event):

Key

- Note–Ranks given for track events are within the athlete's heat only
- Q = Qualified for the next round
- q = Qualified for the next round as a fastest loser or, in field events, by position without achieving the qualifying target
- NR = National record
- N/A = Round not applicable for the event
- Bye = Athlete not required to compete in round

Track & road events
Men

Athlete	Event	Heat		Quarterfinal		Semifinal		Final	
Athlete	Event	Result	Rank	Result	Rank	Result	Rank	Result	Rank
Carlos Nascimento	100 m	Bye		10.37	7	Did not advance			
Ricardo dos Santos	400 m	46.83	7	—N/a		Did not advance			
João Vieira	50 km walk	—N/a						3:51:28	5

Women

Athlete	Event	Heat		Quarterfinal		Semifinal		Final	
Athlete	Event	Result	Rank	Result	Rank	Result	Rank	Result	Rank
Lorène Bazolo	100 m	Bye		11.31	4	Did not advance			
Lorène Bazolo	200 m	23.21	2 Q	—N/a		23.20	7	Did not advance	
Cátia Azevedo	400 m	51.26	3 Q	—N/a		51.32	7	Did not advance	
Salomé Afonso	1500 m	4:10.80	13	—N/a		Did not advance			
Marta Pen	1500 m	4:07.33	10 qJ	—N/a		4:04.15	10	Did not advance	
Sara Moreira	Marathon	—N/a						DNF	
Catarina Ribeiro	Marathon	—N/a						2:55:01	70
Carla Salomé Rocha	Marathon	—N/a						2:34:52	30
Ana Cabecinha	20 km walk	—N/a						1:34:08	20

Field events
Men

Athlete	Event	Qualification		Final	
Athlete	Event	Distance	Position	Distance	Position
Nelson Évora	Triple jump	15.39	27	Did not advance	
Tiago Pereira	Triple jump	16.71	16	Did not advance	
Pedro Pichardo	Triple jump	17.71	1 Q	17.98 NR	1st place, gold medalist(s)
Francisco Belo	Shot put	20.58	16	Did not advance	

Women

Athlete	Event	Qualification		Final	
Athlete	Event	Distance	Position	Distance	Position
Patrícia Mamona	Triple jump	14.54	4 Q	15.01 NR	2nd place, silver medalist(s)
Evelise Veiga	Triple jump	13.93	19	Did not advance	
Auriol Dongmo	Shot put	18.80	8 Q	19.57	4
Liliana Cá	Discus throw	62.85	8 q	63.93	5
Irina Rodrigues	Discus throw	57.03	25	Did not advance	

== Canoeing ==
=== Slalom ===
Portugal qualified one canoeist for the men's K-1 class by finishing in the top eighteen at the 2019 ICF Canoe Slalom World Championships in La Seu d'Urgell, Spain.

Athlete	Event	Preliminary						Semifinal		Final	
Athlete	Event	Run 1	Rank	Run 2	Rank	Best	Rank	Time	Rank	Time	Rank
Antoine Launay	Men's K-1	95.68	10	93.50	11	93.50	12 Q	98.88	11	Did not advance	

=== Sprint ===
Portuguese canoeists qualified three boats in each of the following distances for the Games through the 2019 ICF Canoe Sprint World Championships in Szeged, Hungary.

Athlete	Event	Heats		Quarterfinals		Semifinals		Final	
Athlete	Event	Time	Rank	Time	Rank	Time	Rank	Time	Rank
Fernando Pimenta	Men's K-1 1000 m	3:40.323	1 SF	Bye		3:22.942	1 FA	3:22.478	3rd place, bronze medalist(s)
Messias Baptista; João Ribeiro; Emanuel Silva; David Varela	Men's K-4 500 m	1:25.515	5 QF	1:24.325	4 SF	1:25.268	4 FA	1:25.324	8
Teresa Portela	Women's K-1 200 m	42.050	2 SF	Bye		39.301	6 FB	39.562	10
Teresa Portela	Women's K-1 500 m	1:48.727	2 SF	Bye		1:52.557	2 FA	1:55.814	7
Joana Vasconcelos	Women's K-1 200 m	43.059	5 QF	43.379	4	Did not advance			
Joana Vasconcelos	Women's K-1 500 m	1:57.513	5 QF	1:56.622	6	Did not advance			

Qualification Legend: FA = Qualify to final (medal); FB = Qualify to final B (non-medal)

== Cycling ==
=== Road ===
Portugal entered two riders to compete in the men's Olympic road race, by virtue of their top 50 national finish (for men) in the UCI World Ranking.

Athlete	Event	Time	Rank
João Almeida	Men's road race	6:09:04	13
João Almeida	Men's time trial	58:33.97	16
Nelson Oliveira	Men's road race	6:15:38	41
Nelson Oliveira	Men's time trial	58:59.22	21

=== Track ===
Following the completion of the 2020 UCI Track Cycling World Championships, Portugal entered one rider to compete in the women's omnium based on her final individual UCI Olympic rankings.

Omnium

Athlete	Event	Scratch race		Tempo race		Elimination race		Points race		Total points	Rank
Athlete	Event	Rank	Points	Rank	Points	Rank	Points	Rank	Points	Total points	Rank
Maria Martins	Women's omnium	6	30	8	26	5	32	5	7	95	7

=== Mountain biking ===
Portugal entered one mountain biker to compete in the women's cross-country race by finishing in the top two of the under-23 division at the 2019 UCI Mountain Bike World Championships in Mont-Sainte-Anne, Canada.

Athlete	Event	Time	Rank
Raquel Queirós	Women's cross-country	1:27:46	27

== Equestrian ==
Portugal fielded a squad of three equestrian riders into the Olympic team dressage competition by finishing eighth overall and securing the last of three available berths for Group A and B at the European Championships in Rotterdam, Netherlands. MeanwhIle, one jumping rider was added to the Portuguese roster by finishing in the top two, outside the group selection, of the individual FEI Olympic Rankings for Groups B (South Western Europe).

=== Dressage ===
The Portuguese dressage team was named on June 11, 2021. Carlos Pinto and Sultao Menezes have been named the travelling reserves.

Athlete	Horse	Event	Grand Prix		Grand Prix Special		Grand Prix Freestyle		Overall	
Athlete	Horse	Event	Score	Rank	Score	Rank	Technical	Artistic	Score	Rank
Maria Caetano	Fenix de Tineo	Individual	70.311	27	—N/a		did not advance			
João Miguel Torrão	Equador	Individual	70.186	29	—N/a		did not advance			
Rodrigo Torres	Fogoso	Individual	72.624	17 q	—N/a		74.143	83.743	78.943	16
Maria Caetano; João Miguel Torrão; Rodrigo Torres	See above	Team	6862.5	7 Q	6965.5	8	—N/a		6965.5	8

Qualification Legend: Q = Qualified for the final; q = Qualified for the final as a lucky loser

=== Jumping ===
Athlete	Horse	Event	Qualification		Final		
Athlete	Horse	Event	Penalties	Rank	Penalties	Time	Rank
Luciana Diniz	Vertigo du Desert	Individual	0	=1 Q	4	84.69	10

== Gymnastics ==
=== Artistic ===
Portugal entered one artistic gymnast into the Olympic competition. Rio 2016 Olympian Ana Filipa Martins booked a spot in the women's individual all-around and apparatus events, by finishing last out of the twenty gymnasts eligible for qualification at the 2019 World Championships in Stuttgart, Germany.

Women

Athlete	Event	Qualification						Final					
Athlete	Event	Apparatus				Total	Rank	Apparatus				Total	Rank
Athlete	Event	V	UB	BB	F	Total	Rank	V	UB	BB	F	Total	Rank
Ana Filipa Martins	All-around	13.466	14.300	11.866	12.666	52.298	43	Did not advance					

=== Trampoline ===
Portugal entered one trampoline gymnast into the Olympic competition. Rio 2016 Olympian Diogo Abreu claimed an Olympic spot in the men's event at the 2021 FIG World Cup in Brescia.

Athlete	Event	Qualification		Final	
Athlete	Event	Score	Rank	Score	Rank
Diogo Abreu	Men's	93.420	11	Did not advance	

== Handball ==
Summary

Key:

- ET: After extra time
- P – Match decided by penalty-shootout.

Team	Event	Group stage						Quarterfinal	Semifinal	Final / BM	
Team	Event	Opposition Score	Opposition Score	Opposition Score	Opposition Score	Opposition Score	Rank	Opposition Score	Opposition Score	Opposition Score	Rank
Portugal men's	Men's tournament	Egypt; L 31–37	Bahrain; W 26–25	Sweden; L 28–29	Denmark; L 28–34	Japan; L 30–31	5	Did not advance			

=== Men's tournament ===
Portugal men's national handball team qualified for the Olympics by securing a top-two finish at the Montpellier leg of the 2020 IHF Olympic Qualification Tournament, marking the country's debut in the sport.

Team roster

The squad was announced on 13 July 2021.

Head coach: Paulo Pereira

No.	Pos.	Name	Date of birth (age)	Height	App.	Goals	Club
4	RW	Pedro Portela	6 January 1990 (aged 31)	1.86 m	90	295	Tremblay-en-France Handball
5	LB	Gilberto Duarte	6 July 1990 (aged 31)	1.97 m	101	295	(France) Montpellier Handball
8	P	Victor Iturriza	22 May 1990 (aged 31)	1.93 m	15	51	(Portugal) FC Porto
9	RB	João Ferraz	8 January 1990 (aged 31)	1.98 m	94	156	(Switzerland) HSC Suhr Aarau
10	CB	Miguel Martins	4 November 1997 (aged 23)	1.92 m	56	129	(Hungary) MOL-Pick Szeged
14	CB	Rui Silva	28 April 1993 (aged 28)	1.86 m	93	147	(Portugal) FC Porto
15	P	Daymaro Salina	1 September 1987 (aged 33)	2.00 m	57	100	(Portugal) FC Porto
16	GK	Humberto Gomes	1 January 1978 (aged 43)	1.93 m	85	0	(Portugal) Póvoa AC
22	P	Alexis Borges	6 October 1991 (aged 29)	1.96 m	39	65	(Portugal) S.L. Benfica
23	LW	Diogo Branquinho	25 July 1994 (aged 26)	1.85 m	55	130	(Portugal) FC Porto
25	RW	António Areia	21 June 1990 (aged 31)	1.90 m	58	163	(Portugal) FC Porto
27	LB	André Gomes	27 July 1998 (aged 22)	1.92 m	32	82	(Portugal) FC Porto
41	GK	Gustavo Capdeville	31 August 1997 (aged 23)	1.90 m	14	0	(Portugal) S.L. Benfica
82	P	Luís Frade	11 September 1998 (aged 22)	1.94 m	29	38	(Spain) Barcelona
88	LB	Fábio Magalhães	12 March 1988 (aged 33)	1.94 m	152	315	(Portugal) FC Porto

Group play

Pos	Team	Pld	W	D	L	GF	GA	GD	Pts	Qualification
1	Denmark	5	4	0	1	174	139	+35	8 (Note: Denmark 2 Pts, +2 GD; Egypt 2 Pts, 0 GD, Sweden 2 Pts, −2 GD)	Quarter-finals
2	Egypt	5	4	0	1	154	134	+20	8	Quarter-finals
3	Sweden	5	4	0	1	144	142	+2	8	Quarter-finals
4	Bahrain	5	1	0	4	129	149	−20	2 (Note: Bahrain 2 Pts, +1 GD; Portugal 2 Pts, 0 GD, Japan 2 Pts, −1 GD)	Quarter-finals
5	Portugal	5	1	0	4	143	156	−13	2	
6	Japan (H)	5	1	0	4	146	170	−24	2	

Source: Tokyo 2020 and IHF
Rules for classification: 1) Points; 2) Head-to-head points; 3) Head-to-head goal difference; 4) Head-to-head goals scored; 5) Goal difference; 6) Goals scored; 7) Draw.
(H) Hosts
Notes:

24 July 2021; 19:30	Portugal	31–37	Egypt	Yoyogi National Gymnasium, Tokyo; Referees: Nikolov, Nachevski (MKD)
24 July 2021; 19:30	Ferraz 6	(15–15)	Hesham 7	Yoyogi National Gymnasium, Tokyo; Referees: Nikolov, Nachevski (MKD)
24 July 2021; 19:30	2× (yellow card) 5× (suspension)	Report	1× (yellow card) 2× (suspension)	Yoyogi National Gymnasium, Tokyo; Referees: Nikolov, Nachevski (MKD)

26 July 2021; 19:30	Bahrain	25–26	Portugal	Yoyogi National Gymnasium, Tokyo; Referees: Schulze, Tönnies (GER)
26 July 2021; 19:30	Habib 8	(15–14)	Portela 6	Yoyogi National Gymnasium, Tokyo; Referees: Schulze, Tönnies (GER)
26 July 2021; 19:30	1× (yellow card) 4× (suspension)	Report	1× (yellow card) 5× (suspension)	Yoyogi National Gymnasium, Tokyo; Referees: Schulze, Tönnies (GER)

28 July 2021; 11:00	Sweden	29–28	Portugal	Yoyogi National Gymnasium, Tokyo; Referees: Raluy, Sabroso (ESP)
28 July 2021; 11:00	Ekberg 9	(14–14)	three players 4	Yoyogi National Gymnasium, Tokyo; Referees: Raluy, Sabroso (ESP)
28 July 2021; 11:00	1× (yellow card) 2× (suspension)	Report	1× (yellow card) 6× (suspension)	Yoyogi National Gymnasium, Tokyo; Referees: Raluy, Sabroso (ESP)

30 July 2021; 19:30	Portugal	28–34	Denmark	Yoyogi National Gymnasium, Tokyo; Referees: Nachevski, Nikolov (MKD)
30 July 2021; 19:30	Branquinho 4	(19–20)	M. Hansen 9	Yoyogi National Gymnasium, Tokyo; Referees: Nachevski, Nikolov (MKD)
30 July 2021; 19:30	1× (yellow card) 4× (suspension)	Report	3× (suspension)	Yoyogi National Gymnasium, Tokyo; Referees: Nachevski, Nikolov (MKD)

1 August 2021; 09:00	Portugal	30–31	Japan	Yoyogi National Gymnasium, Tokyo; Referees: Brunner, Salah (SUI)
1 August 2021; 09:00	four players 4	(14–16)	R. Tokuda 6	Yoyogi National Gymnasium, Tokyo; Referees: Brunner, Salah (SUI)
1 August 2021; 09:00	2× (yellow card) 4× (suspension)	Report	2× (yellow card) 2× (suspension)	Yoyogi National Gymnasium, Tokyo; Referees: Brunner, Salah (SUI)

== Judo ==
Portugal qualified eight judoka (two men and six women) for each of the following weight classes at the Games. All of them, with Telma Monteiro (women's lightweight, 57 kg) leading the nation's roster at her fifth straight Olympics, were selected among the top 18 judoka of their respective weight classes based on the IJF World Ranking List of June 28, 2021.

Men

Athlete	Event	Round of 32	Round of 16	Quarterfinals	Semifinals	Repechage	Final / BM	
Athlete	Event	Opposition Result	Opposition Result	Opposition Result	Opposition Result	Opposition Result	Opposition Result	Rank
Anri Egutidze	−81 kg	Borchashvili (AUT); L 00–10	Did not advance					
Jorge Fonseca	−100 kg	Bye	Nikiforov (BEL); W 10–00	Ilyasov (ROC); W 01–00	Cho G-h (KOR); L 00–01	Bye	El Nahas (CAN); W 01–00	3rd place, bronze medalist(s)

Women

Athlete	Event	Round of 32	Round of 16	Quarterfinals	Semifinals	Repechage	Final / BM	
Athlete	Event	Opposition Result	Opposition Result	Opposition Result	Opposition Result	Opposition Result	Opposition Result	Rank
Catarina Costa	−48 kg	Gurbanli (AZE); W 10–00	Li (CHN); W 10–00	Bilodid (UKR); L 00–10	—N/a	Pareto (ARG); W 10–00	Mönkhbatyn (MGL); L 00–10	5
Joana Ramos	−52 kg	Delgado (USA); L 00–10	did not advance					
Telma Monteiro	−57 kg	Dabonne (CIV); W 10–00	Kowalczyk (POL); L 00–10	Did not advance				
Bárbara Timo	−70 kg	Drysdale Daley (JAM); W 10–00	Matić (CRO); L 00–10	Did not advance				
Patrícia Sampaio	−78 kg	León (VEN); W 10–00	Wagner (GER); L 00–10	Did not advance				
Rochele Nunes	+78 kg	Mojica (PUR); W 01–00	Ortíz (CUB); L 00–01	Did not advance				

== Rowing ==
Portugal qualified one boat in the men's lightweight double sculls for the Games by winning the silver medal and securing the first of two berths available at the 2021 FISA European Olympic Qualification Regatta in Varese, Italy.

Athlete	Event	Heats		Repechage		Semifinals		Final	
Athlete	Event	Time	Rank	Time	Rank	Time	Rank	Time	Rank
Afonso Costa; Pedro Fraga	Men's lightweight double sculls	6:44.09	3 R	6:39.95	4 FC	—N/a		6:24.44	13

Qualification Legend: FA=Final A (medal); FB=Final B (non-medal); FC=Final C (non-medal); FD=Final D (non-medal); FE=Final E (non-medal); FF=Final F (non-medal); SA/B=Semifinals A/B; SC/D=Semifinals C/D; SE/F=Semifinals E/F; QF=Quarterfinals; R=Repechage

== Sailing ==
Portuguese sailors qualified one boat in each of the following classes through the 2018 Sailing World Championships, the class-associated Worlds, and the continental regattas.

Athlete	Event	Race													Net points	Final rank
Athlete	Event	1	2	3	4	5	6	7	8	9	10	11	12	M*	Net points	Final rank
Diogo Costa; Pedro Costa	Men's 470	13	10	15	14	1	13	10	16	12	~~17~~	—N/a		EL	104	15
José Costa; Jorge Lima	Men's 49er	11	6	9	6	5	~~20~~	5	10	1	11	4	4	OCS	94	7
Carolina João	Women's Laser Radial	32	34	28	30	~~36~~	13	26	31	21	14	—N/a		EL	229	34

M = Medal race; EL = Eliminated – did not advance into the medal race

== Shooting ==
Portuguese shooters achieved quota places for the following events by virtue of their best finishes at the 2018 ISSF World Championships, the 2019 ISSF World Cup series, European Championships or Games, and European Qualifying Tournament, as long as they obtained a minimum qualifying score (MQS) by May 31, 2020.

Athlete	Event	Qualification		Final	
Athlete	Event	Points	Rank	Points	Rank
João Azevedo	Men's trap	120	20	Did not advance	

== Skateboarding ==
Portugal entered one skateboarder into the Olympic competition. Gustavo Ribeiro booked a spot in the men's street as one of the top 16 skateboarders vying for qualification in the Olympic World Skateboarding Rankings on 30 June 2021.

Athlete	Event	Qualification		Final	
Athlete	Event	Result	Rank	Result	Rank
Gustavo Ribeiro	Men's street	32.66	8 Q	15.05	8

== Surfing ==
Portugal sent three surfers to compete at the Games. Frederico Morais secured a qualification slot in the men's shortboard event for his nation, as the highest-ranked surfer from Europe at the 2019 ISA World Surfing Games in Miyazaki, Japan. On the women's side, Teresa Bonvalot and Yoland Sequeira completed the nation's surfing lineup by scoring a top-two finish within their heat at the 2021 ISA World Surfing Games in El Salvador.

Athlete	Event	Round 1		Round 2		Round 3	Quarterfinal	Semifinal	Final / BM	
Athlete	Event	Score	Rank	Score	Rank	Opposition Result	Opposition Result	Opposition Result	Opposition Result	Rank
Frederico Morais	Men's shortboard	Withdrew due to positive COVID-19 test								
Teresa Bonvalot	Women's shortboard	9.80	2 Q	Bye		Lima (BRA); L 7.50–12.17	Did not advance			
Yolanda Hopkins	Women's shortboard	9.24	4 q	12.23	1 Q	Defay (FRA); W 10.84–9.40	Buitendag (RSA); L 5.46–9.50	Did not advance		

== Swimming ==
Portuguese swimmers further achieved qualifying standards in the following events (up to a maximum of 2 swimmers in each event at the Olympic Qualifying Time (OQT), and potentially 1 at the Olympic Selection Time (OST)):

Men

Athlete	Event	Heat		Semifinal		Final	
Athlete	Event	Time	Rank	Time	Rank	Time	Rank
Tiago Campos	10 km open water	—N/a				1:59:42.0	23
Gabriel Lopes	200 m individual medley	1:58.56	21	Did not advance			
José Paulo Lopes	800 m freestyle	7:56.15	23	—N/a		Did not advance	
José Paulo Lopes	400 m individual medley	4:16.52	20	—N/a		Did not advance	
Alexis Santos	200 m individual medley	1:59.32	28	Did not advance			
Francisco Santos	100 m backstroke	54.35	28	Did not advance			
Francisco Santos	200 m backstroke	1:58.58	22	Did not advance			

Women

Athlete	Event	Heat		Semifinal		Final	
Athlete	Event	Time	Rank	Time	Rank	Time	Rank
Angélica André	10 km open water	—N/a				2:04:40.7	17
Diana Durães	1500 m freestyle	16:29.15	23	—N/a		Did not advance	
Tamila Holub	800 m freestyle	8:40.04	25	—N/a		Did not advance	
Tamila Holub	1500 m freestyle	16:25.16	22	—N/a		Did not advance	
Ana Monteiro	200 m butterfly	2:11.45	14 Q	2:09.82	11	Did not advance	

== Table tennis ==
Portugal entered five athletes into the table tennis competition at the Games. The men's team secured a berth by advancing to the quarterfinal round of the 2020 World Olympic Qualification Event in Gondomar, permitting a maximum of two starters to compete in the men's singles tournament. On the women's side, Rio 2016 Olympian Fu Yu scored an outright semifinal victory to book one of three Olympic spots available at the 2019 European Games in Minsk, Belarus. Shao Jieni was automatically selected among the top ten table tennis players vying for qualification to join Yu in the same event based on the ITTF Olympic Rankings of June 1, 2021.

Athlete	Event	Preliminary	Round 1	Round 2	Round 3	Round of 16	Quarterfinals	Semifinals	Final / BM	
Athlete	Event	Opposition Result	Opposition Result	Opposition Result	Opposition Result	Opposition Result	Opposition Result	Opposition Result	Opposition Result	Rank
Tiago Apolónia	Men's singles	Bye	Omotayo (NGR); W 4–0	Achanta (IND); L 2–4	did not advance					
Marcos Freitas	Men's singles	Bye			Habesohn (AUT); W 4–3	Fan Zd (CHN); L 1–4	did not advance			
Tiago Apolónia; Marcos Freitas; João Monteiro	Men's team	—N/a				Germany; L 0–3	Did not advance			
Fu Yu	Women's singles	Bye		Mukherjee (IND); W 4–0	Ito (JPN); L 1–4	Did not advance				
Shao Jieni	Women's singles	Bye	Kaellberg (SWE); W 4–3	Yu My (SGP); L 0–4	did not advance					

== Taekwondo ==
Portugal entered one athlete into the taekwondo competition at the Games. Rio 2016 Olympian and double world medalist Rui Bragança secured a spot in the men's flyweight category (58 kg) with a top two finish at the 2021 European Taekwondo Olympic Qualification Tournament in Sofia, Bulgaria.

Athlete	Event	Round of 16	Quarterfinals	Semifinals	Repechage	Final / BM	
Athlete	Event	Opposition Result	Opposition Result	Opposition Result	Opposition Result	Opposition Result	Rank
Rui Bragança	Men's −58 kg	Vicente (ESP); L 9–24	did not advance				

== Tennis ==
Portugal entered two tennis players into the Olympic tournament. João Sousa (world no. 109) accepted a spare berth previously allocated by one of the original official entrants, with Pedro (world no. 108) topping the list of tennis players vying for qualification from Europe, to compete in the men's singles based on the ATP World Rankings. Additionally, they opted to play together in the men's doubles.

Athlete	Event	Round of 64	Round of 32	Round of 16	Quarterfinals	Semifinals	Final / BM	
Athlete	Event	Opposition Score	Opposition Score	Opposition Score	Opposition Score	Opposition Score	Opposition Score	Rank
João Sousa	Men's singles	Macháč (CZE); L 7–6^{(7–5)}, 4–6, 4–6	did not advance					
Pedro Sousa	Men's singles	Davidovich (ESP); L 3–6, 0–6	did not advance					
João Sousa; Pedro Sousa	Men's doubles	—N/a	McLachlan / Nishikori (JPN); L 1–6, 4–6	Did not advance				

== Triathlon ==
Portugal entered three triathletes (two men and one woman) to compete at the Olympics. Two-time Olympian João Pedro Silva, Rio 2016 Olympian João José Pereira, and rookie Melanie Santos were selected among the top 26 triathletes vying for qualification in their respective events based on the individual ITU World Rankings of 15 June 2021.

Athlete	Event	Time						Rank
Athlete	Event	Swim (1.5 km)	Trans 1	Bike (40 km)	Trans 2	Run (10 km)	Total	Rank
João José Pereira	Men's	17:56	0:38	56:31	0:31	32:27	1:48:03	27
João Silva	Men's	17:55	0:41	56:30	0:31	31:53	1:47:30	23
Melanie Santos	Women's	19:32	0:41	1:05:07	0:33	36:13	2:02:06	22

== See also ==
- Portugal at the 2020 Summer Paralympics
