= Mahina Maeda =

Japanese surfer (born 1998)

Personal information
- Born: 15 February 1998 (age 28)

Surfing career
- Sport: Surfing
- Major achievements: Qualification for 2020 Summer Olympics
Medal record
Women's surfing
Representing Japan
World Games
Silver medal – second place	2021 Miyazaki	Team
Bronze medal – third place	2019 Miyazaki	Team

Mahina Maeda (前田マヒナ, Maeda Mahina, born 15 February 1998) is a Japanese professional surfer who competes in the World Surf League. She is a three time junior World champion. She represented Japan at the 2020 Summer Olympics as Hawaii was not recognized as a member of the International Olympic Committee.

== Biography ==
Maeda was born to Japanese parents in the United States and was raised in the North Shore of Oahu. She holds American and Japanese dual citizenship. Prior to the 2020 Summer Olympics, she represented Hawaii at international surf competitions.

== Career ==
She won her first WSL world junior title at the age of 16 in Portugal. She became one of the youngest women to have surfed Nazare. She qualified to the 2020 Summer Olympics following her performance at the 2021 ISA World Surfing Games.

She represented Japan at the 2020 Summer Olympics, which also marked her debut appearance at the Olympics. She was eliminated in round 3 of the women's shortboard event.
