= Carwyn Williams =

Welsh surfer

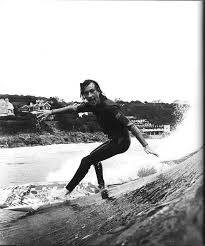
Carwyn Williams Aged 16

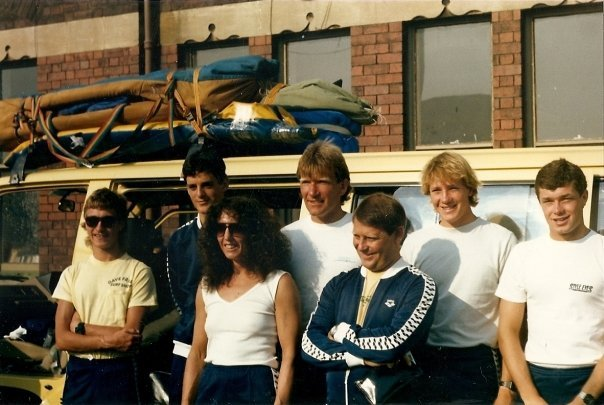
Carwyn, Tucker, Sharp, Cunningham, Dik, Hockridge, Schofield. 1982

Carwyn Williams (born 25 July 1965) is an ex-professional surfer from Mumbles, Wales, who "rose to global prominence" in the 1980s.

Williams grew up in the Langland Bay area, near Mumbles. He had a strong Welsh rivalry during the 1980s with Simon Tucker. Tucker won the Junior British Championship in 1981 with Williams in second place. While Tucker was described as 'Mr Steady', Williams was "flamboyant" and a "likeable rogue" and achieved the higher profile.

In 1985 and 1986 Williams won European Professional Surfing Association (ESPA) tour. He beat reigning World Champion Damien Hardman in 1988 Rip Curl Pro Hossegor, France and became one of the world's greatest and most respected surfers joining the Association of Surfing Professionals (ASP) Top 30. He then went on to win the first ever ASP Europe Championship title in 1989.

Williams was presented with the ASP Life Achievement Award in 2007 for his career and commitment in the sport of surfing.

He runs the Carwyn Williams' Surf House in Hossegor, France and until 2011 the clothing company Taffy Dog Industries.
