= Tia Blanco =

American professional surfer (born 1997)

Personal information
- Born: May 5, 1997 (age 29) Puerto Rico
- Spouse: Brody Jenner
- Children: 2

Surfing career
- Sport: Surfing
- Major achievements: 2× ISA World Women's Champion (2015, 2016)
Medal record
Women's surfing
Representing United States
Competition
Gold medal – first place	2015 Popoyo	Women
Gold medal – first place	2016 Jacó	Women

Tiarah Lue Blanco (born May 5, 1997) is an American professional surfer from San Clemente, California, who won the first place gold medal at the International Surfing Association (ISA) Open Women's World Surfing Championship in 2015 and 2016.

== Early life ==
Blanco was born May 5, 1997, in Puerto Rico. She is of Filipino ancestry from her mother and of Italian, Irish and French from her father. She has one sister named Aja. They were raised Christian. Due to her father's military career as a lieutenant commander in the Coast Guard, Blanco grew up in Puerto Rico, Hawaii, and San Clemente, California. She began surfing at an early age taught by her father.

== Career ==
Professional Surfing

Blanco began competing in surfing competitions at 13 years old. In 2014, Blanco won the Under 18 National Scholastic Surfing Association (NSSA) Southwest Women's and Surfing Prime America Women's competitions.

As a member of the USA Surfing Team, Blanco took 3rd overall in the 2014 World Juniors. At 18 years old, Blanco won first place at the 2015 World Surf League Ron Jon Vans Junior Pro.

Blanco won the first place gold medal at the International Surfing Association (ISA) Open Women's World Surfing Championship 2015 in Popoyo, Nicaragua.

Blanco successfully defended the title by winning the gold medal the 2016 championship in Playa Jacó, Costa Rica.

Television

In 2017, Blanco appeared in MTV's The Challenge: Champs vs. Pros where she raised funds for St. Jude's Children Hospital.

In 2021, Blanco won first place at ABC's The Ultimate Surfer and secured a place to compete on the World Surf League Championship Tour.

Sponsorships

Blanco has secured sponsorships from brands like Reef, Sony, TCL and J7 Surfboards. In 2017, Blanco partnered with VeganSmart to launch her own protein supplement. In 2022, Blanco launched JOLYN x Tiarah, a collaboration with the apparel line. She was named their JOLYN Surf ambassador.

In 2024, she announced partnerships with Hawaiian apparel line Local Motion, sports eyewear brand Dragon Eyewear and perfume line Clean Beauty Collective.

Business

In 2025, Blanco and her sister Aja launched the children's clothing brand Boots & Honey, named after their children. Alongside her family, Blanco runs the sugar cane farm Boots & Honey Farm.

== Personal life ==
Blanco began dating Brody Jenner in 2022 after meeting in Hawaii and became engaged in June 2023. Blanco gave birth to their daughter on July 29, 2023, at their home in Malibu, California. Blanco and Jenner were married in an intimate ceremony at their six-acre home in Malibu on Saturday, July 12, 2025. In March 2026, the couple announced they were expecting their second child due in September. Their second daughter named Dolly Jane was born on September 21, 2026.

Blanco is vegan and in 2014 won PETA's "Libby" Award in acknowledgment for her work as a vegan ambassador. Blanco is an avid painter and yogi.

== Filmography ==
Television
Year	Title	Role
2017	The Challenge: Champs vs. Pros	Herself
2021	The Ultimate Surfer	Herself/Winner
