= Coscarelli =

Coscarelli is an Italian surname. It is mostly found in Calabria and a high concentration of inhabitants called Coscarelli are located in the Province of Cosenza. Notable people with the surname include:

- Erin Coscarelli, American anchor
- Don Coscarelli (born 1954), American film director, producer and screenwriter
- Chloe Coscarelli (born 1987), American vegan chef and author
