= Surfing at the 2028 Summer Olympics – Qualification =

This article details the qualifying phase for surfing at the 2028 Summer Olympics. The qualification system for surfing at the LA28 Olympic Games consists of 48 quota places, with 24 places allocated for men and 24 for women, including host country and universality places. The qualification pathway prioritizes the 2027–2028 World Surf League Championship Tour, the 2028 ISA World Surfing Games, continental representation events through continental multi-event games and 2027 ISA World Surfing Games. Eight men and eight women will qualify through the World Surf League Championship Tour, subject to a maximum of one athlete per country. A further seven athletes per gender will qualify through the 2028 ISA World Surfing Games, also with a maximum of one athlete per country. Five quota places per gender are allocated through continental representation, comprising events for Africa, Oceania, Asia, the Americas, and Europe. Additional quota places are awarded to the National Olympic Committees of the highest-ranked teams at the 2026 and 2027 ISA World Surfing Games, subject to the specified qualification conditions. The United States is guaranteed one host-country place per gender if it has not already obtained a qualification place, while one universality place per gender is also available to eligible NOCs. The qualification period runs from September 2026 to June 2028, with the final quota allocations and subsequent confirmation and reallocation procedures completed before the LA28 Games.

== Timeline ==
Event	Date	Venue
2026 Asian Games	September 25–29, 2026	(Japan) Tahara
2026 ISA World Surfing Games	November 6–15, 2026	(Peru) Punta Rocas
2027 Pan American Games	August 1-7, 2027	(Peru) Lima
2027 ISA World Surfing Games	May 22-30, 2027	(El Salvador) El Sunzal & La Bocana
2027 European Surfing Championships	2027	TBC
2028 World Surf League	August 15, 2027 – June 15, 2028	Various locations
2028 ISA World Surfing Games	2028	TBC

== Summary ==
=== Qualified countries ===
NOC	Men	Women	Total
Australia	0	1	1
Japan	1	1	2
United States	1	1	2
Peru	1	0	1
Total: 4 NOCs	3	3	6

== Events ==
=== Men's shortboard ===
Event	Places	Qualified surfer
Host nation	1	TBD (USA)
2028 World Surf League (max. one per NOC)	8	
2028 ISA World Surfing Games (max. one per NOC)	7	
2026 Asian Games	1	Kanoa Igarashi (JPN)
2027 ISA World Surfing Games – Africa	1	
2027 ISA World Surfing Games – Oceania	1	
2027 European Championships	1	
2027 Pan American Games	1	
2026 ISA World Surfing Games (Team)	1	TBD (PER)
2027 ISA World Surfing Games (Team)	1	
Universality place	1	
Total	24	

=== Women's shortboard ===
Event	Places	Qualified surfer
Host nation	1	TBD (USA)
2028 World Surf League (max. one per NOC)	8	
2028 ISA World Surfing Games (max. one per NOC)	7	
2026 Asian Games	1	Mirai Ikeda (JPN)
2027 ISA World Surfing Games – Africa	1	
2027 ISA World Surfing Games – Oceania	1	
2027 European Championships	1	
2027 Pan American Games	1	
2026 ISA World Surfing Games (Team)	1	TBD (AUS)
2027 ISA World Surfing Games (Team)	1	
Universality place	1	
Total	24	
