= Surf Ranch Resorts =

- Company type: Private
- Industry: Hospitality, Action sports
- Founded: 2009
- Founders: Lucas Boychuk, Travis Boychuk
- Area served: Nicaragua
- Website: www.surfranchnicaragua.com

Surf Ranch Resorts is a brand of privately owned resorts and hotels that targets extreme sport enthusiasts. The brand incorporates skateparks, rock climbing, surf lessons, paintball and other activities into its adventure packages for guests. Surf Ranch Resorts was founded in Nicaragua in 2009 by Canadian brothers, Lucas Boychuk and Travis Boychuk. Surf Ranch Resorts operates a resort in San Juan del Sur with another larger resort being built in Popoyo. The resorts are accessible via the Costa Esmeralda Airport.

== History ==
In 2008, the Boychuk brothers pooled their money and traveled from Kelowna, British Columbia, to Nicaragua to buy land. After putting a down payment on a 2-acre plot in San Juan del Sur, they returned to Canada to save money and find investors. The following year after finding an investor and combining their resources they returned to Nicaragua and began construction on the property. To further finance the resort, villas and condos on the property were sold. The resort's skatepark, the largest in Nicaragua, was completed in 2012. Upon completion of the skatepark, the resort began hosting skate camps and demonstrations by professional skateboarders including Chico Brenes. The remainder of the resort was finished in 2013, and the brothers purchased a 25-acre property in Popoyo where a second resort is under construction.
