= Amuro Tsuzuki =

Japanese surfer (born 2001)

Personal information
- Born: 5 April 2001 (age 25) Tokorozawa, Saitama, Japan
- Height: 5 ft 3 in (160 cm)
- Weight: 121 lb (55 kg)

Surfing career
- Sport: Surfing
- Sponsors: ripcurl
- Major achievements: 2020 Olympics bronze Medal; 2019 World Junior championship

Surfing specifications
- Stance: Natural (regular) foot
Medal record
Women's surfing
Representing Japan
Olympic Games
Bronze medal – third place	2020 Tokyo	Shortboard
World Games
Silver medal – second place	2021 Miyazaki	Team

Amuro Tsuzuki (都筑 有夢路, Tsuzuki Amuro; born 5 April 2001) is a Japanese professional surfer. She competed at the 2020 Summer Olympics, in women's shortboard, winning a bronze medal.

== Career ==
In 2019, she won the World Junior championship. She competed on the World Surf League Tour.
