= Rolf Aurness =

American surfer

Personal information
- Born: February 18, 1952 (age 73) Santa Monica, California, US
- Height: 5 ft 7 in (1.70 m)

Surfing career
- Sport: Surfing
- Best year: 1970
- Major achievements: World Surfing Champion, 1970

Surfing specifications
- Stance: Goofy foot

Rolf Aurness (born February 18, 1952, Santa Monica, California) is an American surfer who won the 1970 World Surfing Championships held at Johanna in Victoria, Australia, beating Midget Farrelly in the finals.

He is the son of the famous Gunsmoke actor James Arness.

== Surfing career ==
When he was nine Aurness suffered a skull fracture after falling from a tree. His father, reported to be an enthusiastic surfer, used surfing to help his son recover. He implemented a strict training regimen of dawn sessions at beaches, long-distance swimming and weekend beach trips, including the Hollister Ranch.

Several times a year they visited Hawaii, renting accommodation on Mākaha beach.

== Personal life ==
Aurness is the son of Gunsmoke actor James Arness (who died on June 3, 2011) and nephew of Mission Impossible actor Peter Graves.

In the decade following his World Surfing Championship win Aurness fell out of surfing due to the deaths of his wife, mother, and sister. His wife died in 1978 from cancer, his mother Virginia (née Chapman) died in 1977 of an accidental drug overdose, and his sister Jenny Lee Aurness died of an apparently deliberate drug overdose in 1975. His adopted brother, Craig, founded the stock photography agency Westlight and also was a photographer for National Geographic.

Achievements
Preceded by Fred Hemmings	ISF World Surfing Champion (men's); 1970	Succeeded by Jimmy Blears
