= The Ultimate Surfer =

American television surfing competition show

- Genre: Surfing; Sports entertainment; Reality competition
- Created by: Kelly Slater
- Presented by: Kelly Slater; Jesse Palmer; Erin Coscarelli; Joe Turpel
- Composer: Raney Shockne
- Country of origin: United States
- Original language: English
- No. of seasons: 1
- No. of episodes: 8

Production
- Executive producers: Craig Piligian; Erik Logan; Dana White
- Producers: Jessi Miley-Dyer; Dave Prodan; Courtney Clark; Beba Rodriguez; Tova Kaplan
- Production location: Lemoore, California
- Cinematography: Jason Hafer
- Camera setup: Multi-camera
- Production companies: Ultimate Fighting Productions, LLC; Pilgrim Media Group; WSL Studios

Original release
- Network: ABC
- Release: August 23 – September 21, 2021

The Ultimate Surfer is an American television surfing competition show that aired on ABC from August 23 to September 21, 2021. In March 2022, the series was canceled after one season.

== Format ==
The Ultimate Surfer, an eight-episode series, gathers some of the world's best amateur surfers to live and train together as they battle it out on the consistent and perfect waves created at the "Surf Ranch" in Lemoore, California. The contestants compete in team and individual challenges, focusing on specific elements of surfing, such as, barrels, cutbacks, turns, and front and back-side surfing where they will compete for the highest score by the judges.

Weekly eliminations will leave two men and two women as finalists. They can either form alliances or rivalries by sending their fellow surfers into a "surf-off", where they must surf at nighttime to get the best score to move on in the competition.

The winner's prize is $100,000 and an opportunity to compete on the WSL Championship Tour, the pinnacle of professional surfing, as well as earn the title of "The Ultimate Surfer".

== Production ==
On November 13, 2019, it was announced that ABC had ordered the series, with Kelly Slater as special correspondent. Craig Piligian, Erik Logan and Dana White served as executive producers. On April 7, 2021, it was announced that the series would premiere on August 16, 2021, later being rescheduled to August 23, 2021. On May 6, 2021, it was announced that Jesse Palmer would host the show, with Erin Coscarelli and Joe Turpel serving as commentators.

On March 30, 2022, it was announced that the series has been cancelled after one season.

== Surfers ==
The surfers were revealed on May 6, 2021.

Surfer	Age	Residence	Status	Ref
Austin Clouse	26	Jacksonville Beach, Florida	Eliminated 1st on August 23, 2021	
Luke Davis	27	Los Angeles, California	Eliminated 2nd on August 24, 2021	
Anastasia Ashley	34	Miami Beach, Florida	Eliminated 3rd on August 24, 2021	
Bruna Zaun	30	Redondo Beach, California	Eliminated 4th on August 30, 2021	
Mason Barnes	26	Venice, Los Angeles	Eliminated 5th on August 31, 2021	
Juli Hernandez	22	Costa Mesa, California	Eliminated 6th on August 31, 2021	
Alejandro Moreda	34	San Juan, Puerto Rico	Eliminated 7th on September 7th, 2021	
Kayla Durden	27	Jacksonville Beach, Florida	Eliminated 8th on September 7th, 2021	
Malia Ward	22	San Clemente, California	Eliminated 9th on September 14th, 2021	
Kai Barger	30	Haiku, Hawaii	Eliminated 10th on September 14th, 2021	
Koa Smith	25	Sunset Beach, Hawaii	Runner-up on September 21st, 2021	
Brianna Cope	25	Koloa, Hawaii	Runner-up on September 21st, 2021	
Zeke Lau	26	Honolulu, Hawaii	Winner on September 21st, 2021	
Tia Blanco	24	Oceanside, California	Winner on September 21st, 2021	

== Contestant progress ==
Contestants	1	2	3	4	5	6	7	8
Tia	Safe	Nom	Nom	Nom	Safe	Safe	Win	Winner
Zeke	Nom	Win	Win	Safe	Safe	Win	Win	Winner
Brianna	Safe	Safe	Safe	Win	Safe	Nom	Nom	Runner-up
Koa	Safe	Safe	Safe	Nom	Safe	Nom	Nom	Runner-up
Kai	Safe	Safe	Elim		In	Safe	Elim	Guest
Malia	Nom	Win	Win	Safe	Safe	Win	Elim	Guest
Kayla	Elim				In	Elim		Guest
Alejandro	Safe	Nom	Nom	Win	Safe	Elim		Guest
Juli	Safe	Safe	Safe	Elim	Out			Guest
Mason	Safe	Safe	Safe	Elim	Out			Guest
Bruna	Safe	Safe	Elim		Out			Guest
Anastasia	Win	Elim			Out			Guest
Luke	Win	Elim			Out			Guest
Austin	Elim				Out			Guest

=== Key ===
Winner The contestant won the competition.
Runner-up The contestant came in second place in the competition.
Win The contestant won the surfing competition with their partner.
Nom The contestant was nominated to surf in the surf off.
Elim The contestant was eliminated in the surf off.
In The contestant won their way back into the competition.
Out The contestant failed to return into the competition.

== Episodes ==
No.	Title	Original release date	Prod. code	U.S. viewers (millions)
1	"Welcome to the Surf Ranch"	August 23, 2021	101	1.43
The 14 up-and-coming surfers arrive at the Kelly Slater's state-of-the-art WSL Surf Ranch in Lemoore, California. After the men and women partner up, the newly formed teams compete in their first Beach Battle in order to get a prize and, more importantly, to earn extra time on the Surf Ranch wave. During the Wave Challenge, they will get judged on their turns. Two surfers will be eliminated in the Surf-off while riding the wave under the lights at night.
2	"Caught Up in Chick Drama"	August 24, 2021	102	1.32
Alliances and rivalries form with the 12 remaining surfers as they go into the Beach Battle. The must hold their breath and a weight in an underwater buoy race around the ranch pool. During the Wave Challenge, they have to show-off their backside techniques on the wave.
3	"Nama-Stay off My Barrel"	August 30, 2021	103	1.38
It's all about balance and barrels for the ten remaining surfers. In the Beach Battle, they must test their strength and stamina to stay on a rolling barrel. During the Wave Challenge, the surfers are judged on how well they can get barrelled in the wave.
4	"Party Wave: Risk It for the Biscuit"	August 31, 2021	104	1.14
The remaining eight surfers hop on their surfboards for their next Beach Battle; a "paddle battle", the ultimate tug-of-war in the water where they must paddle on their boards attached to a rope to a buoy before sending the other team to the dock. The winners receive a sustainable paddleboard. Two teams must swap out partners going into the next competition. Kelly announces the Wave Challenge; the crossover or "party wave", where the surfers have to ride the same wave together and choreograph synchronized runs in order to move on.
5	"A Little Game of This"	September 6, 2021	105	1.27
The six remaining surfers, who are at the halfway point, are surprised by some old "friends" who force them to up their game. They have a "chillax" day while the second chance surfers get new teams to compete with in the wild card wave challenge to get a shot of redemption. The two winning teams then get to night surf against each other in an individual surf-off. The male and female surfer with the highest score will be back in the competition and the lowest score will have to leave for a second time.
6	"Will You Accept This Wave?"	September 7, 2021	106	1.27
Back to eight, the surfers go on a "surf date" by giving surf lessons to Hannah Ann Sluss and Mike Johnson from Bachelor Nation who must decide after which one will accept the red surf leash to move on. They're rewarded with a day glow party and night surf session. Kelly gives them the surfers their weekly technique; "floaters", riding or floating atop the lip of the wave. The surfers will then be judged on length of time floating on the lip and creativity around it during the Wave Challenge. Two more surfers are eliminated in the Surf-off.
7	"Poke the Bear"	September 14, 2021	107	1.32
Jesse challenges the six remaining surfers to face-off in a "Surf Combine", where they paddle, duck-dive and race into a wetsuit in order to be awarded extra waves and win an electric skateboard. Kelly gives them this week's Wave Challenge technique; "best maneuver", tricks like rotations, airs, flips, and rodeos (spins) in order to get the highest score. To help the competitors, WSL Championship tour surfer Filipe Toledo gives them pro tips for the semi-finals.
8	"The Ultimate Surfers"	September 21, 2021	108	1.14
The last four surfers (two men and two women) meet in the final showdown. Kelly surprises them in person with a coaching session on the wave. Then, Jesse "kidnaps" them with blindfolds and drives them back to the Surf Ranch in order to relieve their stress with a spa day. The finalists go into Ultimate Surf-off with three waves and the highest scoring wave will count. Joining the judges are all the eliminated surfers and Erik Logan, CEO of the World Surf League. The man and the woman with the best score will be crowned The Ultimate Surfer, awarded the $100,000 prize money and a wild card spot on the WSL Championship Tour.

== Reception ==
Viewership and ratings per episode of The Ultimate Surfer
No.	Title	Air date	Rating/share (18–49)	Viewers (millions)	DVR (18–49)	DVR viewers (millions)	Total (18–49)	Total viewers (millions)
1	"Welcome to the Surf Ranch"	August 23, 2021	0.3/3	1.43	—N/a	—N/a	—N/a	—N/a
2	"Caught Up in Chick Drama"	August 24, 2021	0.3/3	1.32	—N/a	—N/a	—N/a	—N/a
3	"Nama-Stay off My Barrel"	August 30, 2021	0.3/3	1.38	—N/a	—N/a	—N/a	—N/a
4	"Party Wave: Risk It for the Biscuit"	August 31, 2021	0.2/2	1.14	—N/a	—N/a	—N/a	—N/a
5	"A Little Game of This"	September 6, 2021	0.3/3	1.27	—N/a	—N/a	—N/a	—N/a
6	"Will You Accept This Wave?"	September 7, 2021	0.2/2	1.27	—N/a	—N/a	—N/a	—N/a
7	"Poke the Bear"	September 14, 2021	0.3/3	1.32	—N/a	—N/a	—N/a	—N/a
8	"The Ultimate Surfers"	September 21, 2021	0.3/2	1.14	0.0	0.30	0.3	1.44 (Note: Live+7 ratings were not available, so Live+3 ratings have been used instead.)

== See also ==
- The Ultimate Fighter
