= World Surfing Games =

The ISA World Surfing Games, formerly known as the ISA World Surfing Championships, are organized by world governing body of surfing, the International Surfing Association (ISA), which is recognized by the International Olympic Committee.

== Editions ==
The event was known as the ISF World Surfing Championships between 1964 and 1972. After that, a World Pro--Am Surfing Championship was created that favored a world circuit of events (which is now the World Surf League. The event resurged in 1978 as the ISA World Surfing Championships and has been known as the ISA World Surfing Games since 1996.

Edition	Year	Host city	Country
ISF World Surfing Championships
1	1964	Manly	Australia
2	1965	Lima	Peru
3	1966	San Diego	United States
4	1968	Rincón	Puerto Rico
5	1970	Torquay - Lorne - Johanna	Australia
6	1972	San Diego	United States
ISA World Surfing Championships
7	1978	East London	South Africa
8	1980	Biarritz	France
9	1982	Gold Coast	Australia
10	1984	Huntington Beach	United States
11	1986	Newquay	England
12	1988	Aguadilla	Puerto Rico
13	1990	Chiba	Japan
14	1992	Lacanau	France
15	1994	Rio de Janeiro	Brazil
ISA World Surfing Games
16	1996	Huntington Beach	United States
17	1998	Lisbon	Portugal
18	2000	Maracaípe	Brazil
19	2002	Durban	South Africa
20	2004	Salinas	Ecuador
21	2006	Huntington Beach	United States
22	2008	Costa de Caparica	Portugal
23	2009	Playa Hermosa	Costa Rica
24	2010	Punta Hermosa	Peru
25	2011	Pedasí	Panama
26	2013	Santa Catalina	Panama
27	2014	Punta Rocas	Peru
28	2015	Popoyo	Nicaragua
29	2016	Jacó	Costa Rica
30	2017	Biarritz	France
31	2018	Tahara	Japan
32	2019	Miyazaki	Japan
33	2021	Surf City	El Salvador
34	2022	Huntington Beach	United States
35	2023	Surf City	El Salvador
36	2024	Arecibo	Puerto Rico
37	2025	Surf City	El Salvador
38	2026	Punta Rocas	Peru

== Medallists ==
=== Shortboard ===
==== Men's championship ====
Year	Gold	Silver	Bronze
ISF World Surfing Championships
1964	Midget Farrelly (AUS)	Mike Doyle (USA)	Joey Cabell (USA)
1965	Felipe Pomar (PER)	Nat Young (AUS)	Paul Strauch (USA)
1966	Nat Young (AUS)	Jock Sutherland (USA)	Corky Carroll (USA)
1968	Fred Hemmings (USA)	Midget Farrelly (AUS)	Russell Hughes (AUS)
1970	Rolf Aurness (USA)	Midget Farrelly (AUS)	Peter Drouyn (AUS)
1972	Jimmy Blears (HAW)	David Nuuhiwa (USA)	Peter Townend (AUS)
ISA World Surfing Championships
1978	Antoni Brodowicz (RSA)		
1980	Mark Scott (AUS)		
1982	Tom Curren (USA)	Robert Wolffe (AUS)	Ross Marshall (AUS)
1984	Scott Farnsworth (USA)		
1986	Jeff Booth (USA)	Mark Sainsbury (AUS)	Wilfred Sanford (REU)
1988	Fabio Gouveia (BRA)	Darren Magee (AUS)	Rodrigo Resende (BRA)
1990	Heifara Tahutini (TAH)	Craig McMillan (AUS)	Hemerson Paiva (BRA)
1992	Grant Frost (AUS)	Carl Roux (RSA)	Brenden Margieson (AUS)
1994	Sasha Stocker (AUS)	Charles Cardoso (BRA)	Shawn Sutton (HAW)
ISA World Surfing Games
1996	Taylor Knox (USA)	Victor Ribas (BRA)	Todd Prestage (AUS)
1998	Michael Campbell (AUS)	Peterson Rosa (BRA)	Sasha Stocker (AUS)
2000	Fabio Silva (BRA)	Frederic Robin (FRA)	Dane Beevor (AUS)
2002	Travis Logie (RSA)	Mark Bannister (AUS)	Jihad Khodr (BRA)
2004	Hira Teerinatoofa (TAH)	Teco Padaratz (BRA)	Mark Richardson (AUS)
2006	Jordy Smith (RSA)	Luke Stedman (AUS)	Pat O'Connell (USA)
2008	C.J. Hobgood (USA)	Heath Joske (AUS)	Heath Joske (AUS)
2009	Jérémy Florès (FRA)	Cory Lopez (USA)	Gabriel Villarán (PER)
2010	Hira Teriinatoofa (TAH)	Gabriel Villarán (PER)	Alan Jones (BRA)
2011	Santiago Muñiz (ARG)	Mick Campbell (AUS)	Thomas Woods (AUS)
2013	Shaun Joubert (RSA)	Jean Carlos González (PAN)	Cristóbal de Col (PER)
2014	Leandro Usuna (ARG)	Anthony Fillingim (CRC)	Shane Holmes (AUS)
2015	Noe Mar McGonagle (CRC)	Nic von Rupp (POR)	Shane Holmes (AUS)
2016	Leandro Usuna (ARG)	Lucca Mesinas (PER)	Noe Mar McGonagle (CRC)
2017	Jhony Corzo (MEX)	Joan Duru (FRA)	Pedro Henrique (POR)
2018	Santiago Muñiz (ARG)	Kanoa Igarashi (JPN)	Lucca Mesinas (PER)
2019	Italo Ferreira (BRA)	Kolohe Andino (USA)	Gabriel Medina (BRA)
2021	Joan Duru (FRA)	Kanoa Igarashi (JPN)	Jeremy Flores (FRA)
2022	Kanoa Igarashi (JPN)	Rio Waida (INA)	Jackson Baker (AUS)
2023	Alan Cleland (MEX)	Lucca Mesinas (PER)	Miguel Tudela (PER)
2024	Gabriel Medina (BRA)	Ramzi Boukhiam (MAR)	Kauli Vaast (FRA)
2025	Dane Henry (AUS)	Kauli Vaast (FRA)	Morgan Cibilic (AUS)
2026	Ethan Ewing (AUS)	Lucca Mesinas (PER)	Miguel Tudela (PER)

==== Women's championship ====
Year	Gold	Silver	Bronze
ISF World Surfing Championships
1964	Phyllis O'Donnell (AUS)	Linda Benson (USA)	Heather Nicholson (AUS)
1965	Joyce Hoffman (USA)	Nancy Nelson (USA)	Candy Calhoun (USA)
1966	Joyce Hoffman (USA)	Joey Hamasaki (USA)	Mimi Munro (USA)
1968	Margo Godfrey (USA)	Sharron Weber (USA)	Phyllis O'Donnell (AUS)
1970	Sharron Weber (USA)	Margo Godfrey (USA)	Joyce Hoffman (USA)
1972	Sharron Weber (USA)		
ISA World Surfing Championships
1980	Alisa Schwarztein (USA)		
1982	Jenny Gill (AUS)	Toni Sawer (AUS)	Alisa Schwarztein (USA)
1984	Janice Aragon (AUS)		
1986	Lisa Andersen (USA)	Connie Nixon (AUS)	Anne-Gaëlle Hoarau (REU)
1988	Pauline Menczer (AUS)	Kim Briones (HAW)	Rochelle Gordines (HAW)
1990	Kathy Newman (AUS)	Anne-Gaëlle Hoarau (REU)	Hayley Tasker (AUS)
1992	Lynn Mackenzie (AUS)	Anne-Gaëlle Hoarau (REU)	Sandy Dryden (AUS)
1994	Alessandra Vieira (BRA)	Keala Kennelly (HAW)	Tita Tavares (BRA)
ISA World Surfing Games
1996	Neridah Falconer (AUS)	Tita Tavares (BRA)	Jacqueline Silva (BRA)
1998	Alcione Silva (BRA)	Melanie Bartels (HAW)	Yvonne Rogencamp (AUS)
2000	Tita Tavares (BRA)	Melanie Bartels (HAW)	Sofia Mulanovich (PER)
2002	Chelsea Georgeson (AUS)	Pru Jeffries (AUS)	Heather Clark (RSA)
2004	Sofia Mulanovich (PER)	Julia Christian (USA)	Andrea Lopes (BRA)
2006	Julia Christian (USA)	Jacqueline Silva (BRA)	Rosanne Hodge (RSA)
2008	Sally Fitzgibbons (AUS)	Marie Dejean (FRA)	Camilla Cassia (BRA)
2009	Courtney Conlogue (USA)	Rosanne Hodge (RSA)	Sage Ericson (USA)
2010	Chelsea Hedges (AUS)	Paige Hareb (NZL)	Sofia Mulanovich (PER)
2011	Canelle Bullard (FRA)	Sofia Mulanovich (PER)	Jessi Miley-Dyer (AUS)
2013	Dimity Stoyle (AUS)	Codie Klein (AUS)	Sueren Naraisa (BRA)
2014	Analí Gómez (PER)	Dominic Barona (ECU)	Philippa Anderson (AUS)
2015	Tia Blanco (USA)	Leilani McGonagle (CRC)	Ella Williams (NZL)
2016	Tia Blanco (USA)	Dominic Barona (ECU)	Pauline Ado (FRA)
2017	Pauline Ado (FRA)	Johanne Defay (FRA)	Leilani McGonagle (CRC)
2018	Sally Fitzgibbons (AUS)	Paige Hareb (NZL)	Bianca Buitendag (RSA)
2019	Sofia Mulanovich (PER)	Silvana Lima (BRA)	Bianca Buitendag (RSA)
2021	Sally Fitzgibbons (AUS)	Yolanda Sequeira (POR)	Teresa Bonvalot (POR)
2022	Kirra Pinkerton (USA)	Pauline Ado (FRA)	Sally Fitzgibbons (AUS)
2023	Tatiana Weston-Webb (BRA)	Erin Brooks (CAN)	Johanne Defay (FRA)
2024	Sally Fitzgibbons (AUS)	Tatiana Weston-Webb (BRA)	Johanne Defay (FRA)
2025	Janire González Etxabarri (ESP)	Yolanda Hopkins (POR)	Sally Fitzgibbons (AUS)
2026	Leihani Zoric (AUS)	Johanne Defay (FRA)	Janire González Etxabarri (ESP)

== List of events ==
Year	Event	Division	Name	Country
2016	World Surfing Games	Men	Leandro Usuna	Argentina
2016	World Surfing Games	Women	Tia Blanco	USA
2015	World Surfing Games	Men	Noe Mar McGonagle	Costa Rica
2015	World Surfing Games	Women	Tia Blanco	USA
2014	World Surfing Games	Men	Leandro Usuna	Argentina
2014	World Surfing Games	Women	Anali Gomez	Peru
2014	World Junior Surfing Championship	Boys U18	Luan Wood	Brazil
2014	World Junior Surfing Championship	Boys U16	Leo-Paul Etienne	France
2014	World Junior Surfing Championship	Girls U18	Tatiana Weston-Webb	Hawaii
2014	World Junior Surfing Championship	Girls U16	Mahina Maeda	Hawaii
2014	World StandUp Paddle and Paddleboard Championship	SUP Surfing Men	Poenaiki Raioha	Tahiti
2014	World StandUp Paddle and Paddleboard Championship	SUP Surfing Women	Emmy Merrill	USA
2014	World StandUp Paddle and Paddleboard Championship	SUP Marathon Men	Titouan Puyo	France
2014	World StandUp Paddle and Paddleboard Championship	SUP Marathon Women	Lina Augaitis	Canada
2014	World StandUp Paddle and Paddleboard Championship	Paddleboard Marathon Men	Rhys Burrows	Australia
2014	World StandUp Paddle and Paddleboard Championship	Paddlboard Marathon Women	Jordan Mercer	Australia
2014	World StandUp Paddle and Paddleboard Championship	SUP Technical Race Men	Casper Steinfath	Denmark
2014	World StandUp Paddle and Paddleboard Championship	SUP Technical Race Women	Shakira Westdorp	Australia
2014	World StandUp Paddle and Paddleboard Championship	Paddleboard Technical Race Men	Rhys Burrows	Australia
2014	World StandUp Paddle and Paddleboard Championship	Paddleboard Technical Race Women	Jordan Mercer	Australia
2013	Hainan Wanning Riyue Bay International Surfing Festival	Men	Michael Rodriguez	Brazil
2013	Hainan Wanning Riyue Bay International Surfing Festival	Women	Philippa Anderson	Australia
2013	World Bodyboard Championship	Men	Eder Luciano	Brazil
2013	World Bodyboard Championship	Women	Neymara Carvalho	Brazil
2013	World Bodyboard Championship	Boys U18	Jefferson Bustos	Costa Rica
2013	World Bodyboard Championship	Girls U18	Glorielys Oropeza	Venezuela
2013	World Bodyboard Championship	Dropknee	Luis Rodriguez	Venezuela
2013	World Junior Surfing Championship	Boys U18	Josh Moniz	Hawaii
2013	World Junior Surfing Championship	Boys U16	Jacob Wilcox	Australia
2013	World Junior Surfing Championship	Girls U18	Tatiana Weston-Webb	Hawaii
2013	World Junior Surfing Championship	Girls U16	Mahina Maeda	Hawaii
2013	World Kneeboard Surfing Championship	Men	David Parkes	Australia
2013	World Kneeboard Surfing Championship	Women	Karelle Poppke	Tahiti
2013	World Kneeboard Surfing Championship	Boys U18	Yoisis Delgado	Venezuela
2013	World Kneeboard Surfing Championship	Girls U18	Karelle Poppke	Tahiti
2013	World Kneeboard Surfing Championship	Masters	Ruben Gutierrez	Spain
2013	World Kneeboard Surfing Championship	Senior Men	Chayne Simpson	Australia
2013	World Kneeboard Surfing Championship	Senior Women	Maria Eugenia Rojas	Venezuela
2013	World Kneeboard Surfing Championship	Grand Masters	Gerome Blanco	France
2013	World Kneeboard Surfing Championship	Kahuna	Pascal Luciani	Tahiti
2013	World Kneeboard Surfing Championship	Grand Kahuna	David Parkes	Australia
2013	World Kneeboard Surfing Championship	ROBB	Philippe Klima	Tahiti
2013	World Kneeboard Surfing Championship	Open Vahina	Karelle Poppke	Tahiti
2013	World Longboard Championship	Men	Antoine Delpero	France
2013	World Longboard Championship	Women	Simone Robb	South Africa
2013	World Longboard Championship	Junior	Honolua Blomfield	Hawaii
2013	World Masters Surfing Championship	Masters	Greg Emslie	South Africa
2013	World Masters Surfing Championship	Grand Masters	Sunny Garcia	Hawaii
2013	World Masters Surfing Championship	Kahunas	Mike Latronic	Hawaii
2013	World Masters Surfing Championship	Grand Kahuna	Chris Knutsen	South Africa
2013	World Masters Surfing Championship	Women Masters	Layne Beachley	Australia
2013	World Surfing Games	Men	Shaun Joubert	South Africa
2013	World Surfing Games	Women	Dimity Stoyle	Australia
2013	World StandUp Paddle and Paddleboard Championship	SUP Surfing Men	Sean Poynter	USA
2013	World StandUp Paddle and Paddleboard Championship	SUP Surfing Women	Nicole Pacelli	Brazil
2013	World StandUp Paddle and Paddleboard Championship	SUP Marathon Men	Jamie Mitchell	Australia
2013	World StandUp Paddle and Paddleboard Championship	SUP Marathon Women	Angela Jackson	Australia
2013	World StandUp Paddle and Paddleboard Championship	Paddleboard Marathon Men	Brad Gaul	Australia
2013	World StandUp Paddle and Paddleboard Championship	Paddlboard Marathon Women	Jordan Mercer	Australia
2013	World StandUp Paddle and Paddleboard Championship	SUP Technical Race Men	Casper Steinfath	Denmark
2013	World StandUp Paddle and Paddleboard Championship	SUP Technical Race Women	Angela Jackson	Australia
2013	World StandUp Paddle and Paddleboard Championship	Paddleboard Technical Race Men	Lincoln Dews	Australia
2013	World StandUp Paddle and Paddleboard Championship	Paddleboard Technical Race Women	Jordan Mercer	Australia
2013	World Tandem Surfing Championship		Sara Burel & Rico Leroy	France
2012	Hainan Wanning Riyue Bay International Surfing Festival	Men	Heath Joske	Australia
2012	Hainan Wanning Riyue Bay International Surfing Festival	Women	Sofia Mulanovich	Peru
2012	World Junior Surfing Championship	Boys U18	Matheus Navarro	Brazil
2012	World Junior Surfing Championship	Boys U16	Kalani David	Hawaii
2012	World Junior Surfing Championship	Girls U18	Dax McGill	Hawaii
2012	World Masters Surfing Championship	Masters	Magnum Martinez	Venezuela
2012	World Masters Surfing Championship	Grand Masters	Sunny Garcia	Hawaii
2012	World Masters Surfing Championship	Kahunas	James Hogan	USA
2012	World Masters Surfing Championship	Grand Kahuna	Javier Huarcaya	Peru
2012	World Masters Surfing Championship	Women Master	Rochelle Ballard	Hawaii
2012	World StandUp Paddle and Paddleboard Championship	SUP Surfing Men	Antoine Delpero	France
2012	World StandUp Paddle and Paddleboard Championship	SUP Surfing Women	Emmy Merrill	USA
2012	World StandUp Paddle and Paddleboard Championship	SUP Marathon Men	Jamie Mitchell	Australia
2012	World StandUp Paddle and Paddleboard Championship	SUP Marathon Women	Brandi Baksic	USA
2012	World StandUp Paddle and Paddleboard Championship	Paddleboard Marathon Men	Brad Gaul	Australia
2012	World StandUp Paddle and Paddleboard Championship	Paddlboard Marathon Women	Jordan Mercer	Australia
2012	World StandUp Paddle and Paddleboard Championship	SUP Technical Race Men	Travis Grant	Australia
2012	World StandUp Paddle and Paddleboard Championship	SUP Technical Race Women	Brandi Baksic	USA
2012	World StandUp Paddle and Paddleboard Championship	Paddleboard Technical Race Men	Brad Gaul	Australia
2012	World StandUp Paddle and Paddleboard Championship	Paddleboard Technical Race Women	Jordan Mercer	Australia
2011	World Bodyboard Championship	Men	Pierre Luis Costes	France
2011	World Bodyboard Championship	Women	Isabela Sousa	Brazil
2011	World Bodyboard Championship	Junior	Eduardo Rodriguez	Spain
2011	World Bodyboard Championship	Dropknee	Ardiel Jimenez	Spain
2011	World Junior Surfing Championship	Boys U18	Cristobal de Col	Peru
2011	World Junior Surfing Championship	Boys U16	Filipe Toledo	Brazil
2011	World Junior Surfing Championship	Girls U18	Cannelle Bulard	France
2011	World Masters Surfing Championship	Masters	Carlos Cabrero	Puerto Rico
2011	World Masters Surfing Championship	Grand Masters	Juan Ashton	Puerto Rico
2011	World Masters Surfing Championship	Kahunas	Tom Curren	USA
2011	World Masters Surfing Championship	Grand Kahuna	Craig Schieber	Costa Rica
2011	World Masters Surfing Championship	Women Master	Layne Beachley	Australia
2011	World Surfing Games	Men	Santiago Muniz	Argentina
2011	World Surfing Games	Women	Cannelle Bulard	France
2011	World Surfing Games	Longboard	Toni Silvagni	USA
2011	World Tandem Surfing Championship		Clement Cetran & Dhelia Birou	France
2010	World Junior Surfing Championship	Boys U18	Gabriel Medina	Brazil
2010	World Junior Surfing Championship	Boys U16	Matt Banting	Australia
2010	World Junior Surfing Championship	Girls U18	Tyler Wright	Australia
2010	World Masters Surfing Championship	Masters	Andrew Banks	South Africa
2010	World Masters Surfing Championship	Grand Masters	Juan Ashton	Puerto Rico
2010	World Masters Surfing Championship	Kahunas	Rob Baldwin	Australia
2010	World Masters Surfing Championship	Grand Kahuna	Chris Knutsen	South Africa
2010	World Masters Surfing Championship	Women Master	Heather Clark	South Africa
2010	World Surfing Games	Men	Hira Teriinatoofa	Tahiti
2010	World Surfing Games	Women	Chelsea Hedges	Australia
2010	World Surfing Games	Longboard	Rodrigo Sphyer	Brazil
2010	World Tandem Surfing Championship		Clement Cetran & Dhelia Birou	France
2009	Tandem Masters World Championship		Mark & Debbie Gale	USA
2009	World Junior Surfing Championship	Boys U18	Dean Bowen	Australia
2009	World Junior Surfing Championship	Boys U16	Keanu Asing	Hawaii
2009	World Junior Surfing Championship	Girls U18	Tyler Wright	Australia
2009	World Surfing Games	Men	Jeremy Flores	France
2009	World Surfing Games	Women	Courtney Conlogue	USA
2009	World Surfing Games	Longboard	Antoine Delpero	France
2008	Tandem Masters World Championship		Bear Woznick & Krystal Apeles	Hawaii
2008	World Junior Surfing Championship	Boys U18	Alejo Muniz	Brazil
2008	World Junior Surfing Championship	Boys U16	Tamaroa McComb	Tahiti
2008	World Junior Surfing Championship	Girls U18	Laura Enever	Australia
2008	World Masters Surfing Championship	Masters	Juan Ashton	Puerto Rico
2008	World Masters Surfing Championship	Grand Masters	Rob Page	Australia
2008	World Masters Surfing Championship	Kahunas	Marc Wright	South Africa
2008	World Masters Surfing Championship	Grand Kahuna	Chris Knutsen	South Africa
2008	World Masters Surfing Championship	Women Master	Heather Clark	South Africa
2008	World Surfing Games	Men	CJ Hobgood	USA
2008	World Surfing Games	Women	Sally Fitzgibbons	Australia
2008	World Surfing Games	Longboard	Matthew Moir	South Africa
2008	World Surfing Games	Bodyboard	Marcus Lima	Brazil
2008	World Surfing Games	Women Bodyboard	Natasha Sagardia	Puerto Rico
2007	World Kneeboard Surfing Titles	Women	Jodie Winter	United Kingdom
2007	Tandem Masters World Championship		Bear Woznick & Krystal Apeles	Hawaii
2007	World Junior Surfing Championship	Boys U18	Jadson Andre	Brazil
2007	World Junior Surfing Championship	Boys U16	Garrett Parkes	Australia
2007	World Junior Surfing Championship	Girls U18	Sally Fitzgibbons	Australia
2007	World Kneeboard Surfing Titles	Men	Gavin Colman	Australia
2007	World Masters Surfing Championship	Masters	Juan Ashton	Puerto Rico
2007	World Masters Surfing Championship	Grand Masters	Magoo de la Rosa	Peru
2007	World Masters Surfing Championship	Kahunas	Chris Knutsen	South Africa
2006	Tandem Masters World Championship		Mark & Debbie Gale	USA
2006	World Junior Surfing Championship	Boys U18	Julian Wilson	Australia
2006	World Junior Surfing Championship	Boys U16	Owen Wright	Australia
2006	World Junior Surfing Championship	Girls U18	Pauline Ado	France
2006	World Surfing Games	Men	Jordy Smith	South Africa
2006	World Surfing Games	Women	Julia Christian	USA
2006	World Surfing Games	Longboard	Matthew Moir	South Africa
2006	World Surfing Games	Bodyboard	Manuel Centeno	Portugal
2006	World Surfing Games	Women Bodyboard	Kira Llewellyn	Australia
2006	World Tandem Surfing Championship		Sara Burel & Rico Leroy	France
2005	World Junior Surfing Championship	Boys U18	Jefferson Silva	Brazil
2005	World Junior Surfing Championship	Boys U16	Tonino Benson	Hawaii
2005	World Junior Surfing Championship	Girls U18	Stephanie Gilmore	Australia
2004	World Junior Surfing Championship	Boys U18	James Wood	Australia
2004	World Junior Surfing Championship	Boys U16	Matt Wilkinson	Australia
2004	World Junior Surfing Championship	Girls U18	Stephanie Gilmore	Australia
2004	World Surfing Games	Men	Hira Teriinatoofa	Tahiti
2004	World Surfing Games	Women	Sofia Mulanovich	Peru
2004	World Surfing Games	Longboard	Marcelo Freitas	Brazil
2004	World Surfing Games	Bodyboard	Andrew Lester	Australia
2004	World Surfing Games	Women Bodyboard	Kira Llewellyn	Australia
2003	World Junior Surfing Championship	Boys U18	Ben Dunn	Australia
2003	World Junior Surfing Championship	Boys U16	Jordan Smith	South Africa
2003	World Junior Surfing Championship	Girls U19	Jessie Miley-Dyer	Australia
2002	World Surfing Games	Men	Travis Logie	South Africa
2002	World Surfing Games	Women	Chelsea Georgeson	Australia
2002	World Surfing Games	Junior	Warwick Wright	South Africa
2002	World Surfing Games	Kneeboard	Kyle Bryant	Australia
2002	World Surfing Games	Longboard	Marcelo Freitas	Brazil
2002	World Surfing Games	Bodyboard	Nicolas Capdeville	France
2002	World Surfing Games	Women Bodyboard	Neymara Carvalho	Brazil
2000	World Surfing Games	Men	Fabio Silva	Brazil
2000	World Surfing Games	Women	Tita Tavares	Brazil
2000	World Surfing Games	Junior	Joel Centeio	Hawaii
2000	World Surfing Games	Kneeboard	Sergio Peixe	Brazil
2000	World Surfing Games	Longboard	Marcelo Freitas	Brazil
2000	World Surfing Games	Bodyboard	Guilherme Tamega	Brazil
2000	World Surfing Games	Women Bodyboard	Karla Costa	Brazil
1998	Big Wave Team World Championships	Men	Carlos Burle	Brazil
1998	World Surfing Games	Men	Michael Campbell	Australia
1998	World Surfing Games	Women	Alcione Silva	Brazil
1998	World Surfing Games	Junior	Dean Morrison	Australia
1998	World Surfing Games	Kneeboard	Clinton "Gigs" Celliers	South Africa
1998	World Surfing Games	Longboard	Alexander Salazar	Brazil
1998	World Surfing Games	Bodyboard	Goncalo Farias	Portugal
1998	World Surfing Games	Women Bodyboard	Dora Gomes	Portugal
1996	World Surfing Games	Longboard	Geoff Moysa	USA
1996	World Surfing Games	Men	Taylor Knox	USA
1996	World Surfing Games	Women	Neridah Falconer	Australia
1996	World Surfing Games	Junior	Ben Burgeois	USA
1996	World Surfing Games	Kneeboard	Clinton "Gigs" Celliers	South Africa
1996	World Surfing Games	Bodyboard	Guilherme Tamega	Brazil
1996	World Surfing Games	Women Bodyboard	Daniela Freitas	Brazil
1995	World Grommet Title	Boys U18	Mitch Dawkins	Australia
1995	World Grommet Title	Boys U16	Michael Lowe	Australia
1995	World Grommet Title	Girls U18	Melanie Redman	Australia
1994	World Amateur Titles	Men	Sasha Stocker	Australia
1994	World Amateur Titles	Women	Alessandra Vieira	Brazil
1994	World Amateur Titles	Junior	Kalani Robb	Hawaii
1994	World Amateur Titles	Kneeboard	Clinton "Gigs" Celliers	South Africa
1994	World Amateur Titles	Longboard	Michel Demont	Tahiti
1994	World Amateur Titles	Bodyboard	Jefferson Anute	Brazil
1992	World Amateur Titles	Bodyboard	Nicolas Capdeville	France
1992	World Surfing Championship	Men	Grant Frost	Australia
1992	World Surfing Championship	Women	Lyn Mackenzie	Australia
1992	World Surfing Championship	Junior	Chad Edser	Australia
1992	World Surfing Championship	Kneeboard	Clinton "Gigs" Celliers	South Africa
1992	World Surfing Championship	Longboard	Teva Noble	Tahiti
1990	World Surfing Championship	Men	Heifara Tahutini	Tahiti
1990	World Surfing Championship	Women	Kathy Newman	Australia
1990	World Surfing Championship	Junior	Shane Bevan	Australia
1990	World Surfing Championship	Kneeboard	Simon Farrer	Australia
1990	World Surfing Championship	Longboard	Wayne Dean	Australia
1990	World Surfing Championship	Bodyboard	Jackie Buder	Hawaii
1988	World Surfing Titles	Men	Fabio Gouveia	Brazil
1988	World Surfing Titles	Women	Pauline Menczer	Australia
1988	World Surfing Titles	Junior	Chris Brown	USA
1988	World Surfing Titles	Kneeboard	Simon Farrer	Australia
1988	World Surfing Titles	Longboard	Andrew McKinnon	Australia
1988	World Surfing Titles	Bodyboard	Chris Cunninghan	USA
1986	World Surfing Championship	Men	Jeff Booth	USA
1986	World Surfing Championship	Women	Lisa Andersen	USA
1986	World Surfing Championship	Junior	John Shimooka	Hawaii
1986	World Surfing Championship	Kneeboard	Michael Novakov	Australia
1984	World Surfing Championship	Men	Scott Farnsworth	USA
1984	World Surfing Championship	Women	Janice Aragon	Australia
1984	World Surfing Championship	Junior	Damian Hardman	Australia
1984	World Surfing Championship	Kneeboard	Michael Novakov	Australia
1982	World Surfing Championship	Men	Tom Curren	USA
1982	World Surfing Championship	Women	Jenny Gill	Australia
1982	World Surfing Championship	Junior	Bruce Ellis	Australia
1982	World Surfing Championship	Kneeboard	Michael Novakov	Australia
1980	World Surfing Championship	Men	Mark Scott	Australia
1980	World Surfing Championship	Women	Alisa Schwarztein	USA
1980	World Surfing Championship	Junior	Tom Curren	USA
1978	World Surfing Championship	Men	Antoni Brodowicz	South Africa
1972	World Surfing Championship	Men	Jim Blears	Hawaii
1972	World Surfing Championship	Women	Sharon Webber	Hawaii
1970	World Surfing Championship	Men	Rolf Aurness	USA
1970	World Surfing Championship	Women	Sharon Webber	Hawaii
1968	World Surfing Championship	Men	Fred Hemmings	Hawaii
1968	World Surfing Championship	Women	Margo Godfrey	USA
1966	World Surfing Championship	Men	Nat Young	Australia
1966	World Surfing Championship	Women	Joyce Hoffman	USA
1965	World Surfing Championship	Big Wave	Felipe Pomar	Peru
1965	World Surfing Championship	Small Wave	Midget Farrelly	Australia
1965	World Surfing Championship	Women	Joyce Hoffman	USA
1965	World Surfing Championship	Hotdogging	Paul Strauch	Hawaii
1964	World Surfing Championship	Men	Midget Farrelly	Australia
1964	World Surfing Championship	Women	Phyllis O'Donnell	Australia
1964	World Surfing Championship	Junior (only Australian Surfers)	Robert Conelly	Australia

== Results of the World Surfing Games ==
World Surfing Games (WSG) is an ISA World Championship that brings together surfers from all over the world, currently features the Open Men, Open Women and Team competition, but formerly used to include several more like Junior, longboard, kneeboard, bodyboard and Tandem which now feature separate events like the StandUp Paddle and Paddleboard Championship due to their popularity.

=== 2017 ISA World Surfing Games, Biarritz, France ===
it was held between May 20 – 28, 2017

==== 2017 Open Men Championship ====
1. (Mexico) Jhony Corzo, Champion Gold Medal
2. (France) Joan Duru, Silver Medal
3. (Portugal) Pedro Henrique, Bronze Medal
4. (Spain) Jonathan Gonzalez, Copper Medal

==== 2017 Open Women Championship ====
1. (France) Pauline Ado, Champion Gold Medal
2. (France) Johanne Defay, Silver Medal
3. (Costa Rica) Leilani McGonagle, Bronze Medal
4. (South Africa) Bianca Buitendag, Copper Medal

==== 2017 Overall World Team Championship Results ====
1. France 4,275 points, (Champions Gold Medal)
2. Portugal - 2,850 points, (Silver Medal)
3. Spain - 2,560 points, (Bronze Medal)
4. Mexico - 2,455 points, (Copper Medal)
5. Japan - 2,395 points
6. Peru - 2,193 points
7. United States - 2,158 points
8. Brazil - 2,120 points
9. Costa Rica - 2,113 points
10. South Africa - 1,965 points
11. Tahiti - 1,960 points
12. Australia - 1,880 points
13. England - 1,833 points
14. New Zealand - 1,781 points
15. Morocco - 1,731 points
16. Uruguay - 1,728 points
17. Ecuador - 1,718 points
18. Germany - 1,533 points
19. Nicaragua - 1,513 points
20. Sweden - 1,440 points
21. Canada - 1,374 points
22. Argentina - 1,341 points
23. Chile - 1,261 points
24. Netherlands - 1,231 points
25. Israel - 1,181 points
26. Panama - 1,174 points
27. Switzerland - 1,165 points
28. Wales - 947 points
29. Italy - 917 points
30. China - 882 points
31. Denmark - 770 points
32. Norway - 755 points
33. South Korea - 734 points
34. Russia - 731 points
35. Chinese Taipei - 699 points
36. Puerto Rico - 628 points
37. Senegal - 606 points
38. Scotland - 604 points
39. China - 584 points
40. Ireland - 488 points
41. Austria - 451 points
42. Turkey - 352 points
43. Fiji - 154 points
44. Dominican Republic - 154 points
45. Greece - 71 points
46. Afghanistan - 71 points
47. United States Virgin Islands - 51 points

=== 2016 ISA World Surfing Games, Playa Jaco, Jacó, Costa Rica ===
it was held between August 6 – 14, 2016

==== 2016 Open Men Championship ====
1. (Argentina) Leandro Usuna, Champion Gold Medal
2. (Peru) Lucca Mesinas, Silver Medal
3. (Costa Rica) Noe Mar McGonagle, Bronze Medal
4. (Venezuela) Francisco Bellorin, Copper Medal

==== 2016 Open Women Championship ====
1. (United States) Tia Blanco, Champion Gold Medal
2. (Venezuela) Dominic Barona, Silver Medal
3. (France) Pauline Ado, Bronze Medal
4. (France) Justine Dupont, Copper Medal

==== 2016 Overall World Team Championship Results ====
1. Peru 3,188 points, (Champions Gold Medal)
2. Portugal - 2,924 points, (Silver Medal)
3. United States - 2,860 points, (Bronze Medal)
4. France - 2,848 points, (Copper Medal)
5. Costa Rica - 2,785 points
6. Argentina - 2,725 points
7. Japan - 2,576 points
8. New Zealand - 2,179 points
9. Australia - 2,123 points
10. Ecuador - 2,078 points
11. South Africa - 2,058 points
12. Venezuela - 2,045 points
13. Chile - 1,860 points
14. Mexico - 1,703 points
15. Nicaragua - 1,560 points
16. Panama - 1,554 points
17. Puerto Rico - 1,474 points
18. Italy - 1,350 points
19. Switzerland - 1,308 points
20. Guatemala - 1,218 points
21. Canada - 1,170 points
22. Russia - 1,170 points
23. Sweden - 1,158 points
24. Colombia - 1,050 points
25. Denmark - 300 points
26. Uruguay - 264 points

=== 2015 ISA World Surfing Games, Playa Popoyo, Nicaragua ===
it was held between May 31 – June 7, 2015

==== 2015 Open Men Championship ====
1. (Costa Rica) Noe Mar McGonagle, Champion Gold Medal
2. (Portugal) Nic von Rupp, Silver Medal
3. (Australia) Shane Holmes, Bronze Medal
4. (Argentina) Leandro Usuna, Copper Medal

==== 2015 Open Women Championship ====
1. (United States) Tia Blanco, Champion Gold Medal
2. (Costa Rica) Leilani McGonagle, Silver Medal
3. (New Zealand) Ella Williams, Bronze Medal
4. (Barbados) Chelsea Tuach, Copper Medal

==== 2015 Overall World Team Championship Results ====
1. Costa Rica 3,468 points, (Champions Gold Medal)
2. Portugal - 2,980 points, (Silver Medal)
3. United States - 2,919 points, (Bronze Medal)
4. Peru - 2,913 points, (Copper Medal)
5. Australia - 2,793 points
6. Argentina - 2,563 points
7. Ecuador - 2,281 points
8. New Zealand - 2,241 points
9. Chile - 2,143 points
10. Mexico - 2,125 points
11. Puerto Rico - 1,860 points
12. Japan - 1,770 points
13. Uruguay - 1,695 points
14. Nicaragua - 1,643 points
15. Guatemala - 1,524 points
16. Panama - 1,511 points
17. Barbados - 1,415 points
18. Switzerland - 1,353 points
19. El Salvador - 1,278 points
20. Scotland - 1,128 points
21. Brazil - 980 points
22. Venezuela - 894 points
23. United States Virgin Islands - 660 points
24. Germany - 570 points
25. Israel - 510 points
26. Denmark - 330 points
27. Sweden - 120 points

=== 2014 ISA 50th Anniversary World Surfing Games, Punta Rocas, Lima, Peru ===
(celebrating the 50th anniversary 1964 - 2014)
it was held between October 24 – November 1, 2014

==== 2014 Open Men Championship ====
1. (Argentina) Leandro Usuna, Champion Gold Medal
2. (Costa Rica) Anthony Fillingim, Silver Medal
3. (Australia) Shane Holmes, Bronze Medal
4. (Australia) Nicholas Squires, Copper Medal

==== 2014 Open Women Championship ====
1. (Peru) Anali Gomez, Champion Gold Medal
2. (Ecuador) Dominic Barona, Silver Medal
3. (Australia) Philippa Anderson, Bronze Medal
4. (Australia) Jessica Grimwood, Copper Medal

==== 2014 Overall World Team Championship Results ====
1. Peru 11,402 points, (Champions Gold Medal)
2. Australia - 11,340 points, (Silver Medal)
3. Argentina - 10,922 points, (Bronze Medal)
4. Costa Rica - 9,508 points, (Copper Medal)
5. Ecuador - 8,330 points
6. South Africa - 8,268 points
7. Chile - 7,830 points
8. Puerto Rico - 6,720 points
9. Japan - 6,540 points
10. Panama - 6,400 points
11. New Zealand - 6,352 points
12. Mexico - 6,340 points
13. Uruguay - 5,760 points
14. Colombia - 5,540 points
15. Switzerland - 4,560 points
16. Scotland - 3,952 points
17. Tahiti - 3,756 points
18. Russia - 3,456 points
19. Venezuela - 2,520 points
20. Israel - 2,280 points
21. Turkey - 1,152 points
22. Dubai - 720 points

=== 2013 ISA World Surfing Games, Playa Santa Catalina, Panama ===
==== 2013 Open Men Championship ====
1. (South Africa) Shaun Joubert, Champion Gold Medal
2. (Panama) Jean Carlos Gonzalez, Silver Medal
3. (Peru) Cristobal De Col, Bronze Medal
4. (Australia) Russell Molony, Copper Medal

==== 2013 Open Women Championship ====
1. (Australia) Dimity Stoyle, Champion Gold Medal
2. (Australia) Codie Klein, Silver Medal
3. (Brazil) Suelen Naraisa, Bronze Medal
4. (New Zealand) Ella Williams, Copper Medal

==== 2013 Overall World Team Championship Results ====
1. South Africa 11,102 points, (Champions Gold Medal)
2. Australia - 10,332 points, (Silver Medal)
3. Peru - 9,636 points, (Bronze Medal)
4. Brazil - 9,146 points, (Copper Medal)
5. Panama - 7,946 points
6. Costa Rica - 7,678 points
7. Argentina - 7,422 points
8. Chile - 7,286 points
9. New Zealand - 7,000 points
10. Mexico - 6,752 points
11. Ecuador - 6,630 points
12. Venezuela - 6,620 points
13. Puerto Rico - 6,520 points
14. Japan - 6,116 points
15. Italy - 6,060 points
16. El Salvador - 5,400 points
17. Guatemala - 4,866 points
18. Switzerland - 4,504 points
19. Uruguay - 3,732 points
20. Jamaica - 3,096 points
21. Turkey - 1,152 points
22. Canada - 720 points
23. Sweden - 720 points
24. Russia - 576 points

== See also ==
- International Surfing Association
