= Francesco Zaza =

Italian equestrian

Personal information
- Born: Francesco Zaza; Feb 1, 1984 (age 42) Monza, Italy

Sport
- Country: Italy
- Sport: Equestrian
- Coached by: Laura Conz Dall'Ora

Achievements and titles
- Olympic finals: 2020 Olympic Games

Francesco Zaza (born 1 February 1984) is an Italian equestrian athlete. He competed at the Eventing European Championships in 2007 in Pratoni del Vivaro. In 2017 he made his debut in international dressage in the Small Tour with his horse Wispering Romance, the same horse he will compete at the 2020 Olympic Games. In 2020 he won gold during the Italian Dressage Championships.

Zaza represented Italy at the Olympic Games in Tokyo, Japan, finishing 43rd in the individual competition.
