= Association of Surfing Professionals Europe =

European sport governing body

Coordinates: 51°26′44″N 3°41′02″E

World Surf League Europe
- Abbreviation: WSL Europe
- Formation: 1 January 1989; 37 years ago
- Type: Sports organisation, Professional Surfing
- Headquarters: Capbreton, France
- Region served: Europe
- Official language: English
- Main organ: WSL Europe
- Parent organization: World Surf League
- Website: www.worldsurfleague.com

The Association of Surfing Professionals Europe (ASP Europe) is the governing body for professional surfers in Europe and is dedicated to showcasing the continent's best talent in a variety of progressive formats. It is one of seven regions of the ASP World Tour.

== History ==
=== Creation of the WSL ===
Founded in 1989, the WSL Europe was formed to promote professional surfing in Europe. Its objective is to equally benefit European surfers, sponsors and event promoters alike.

Each year this pro-am circuit include contests between January and November with QS 1,000 - QS 10,000 events, Junior, Longboard and specialty events. Most of the events are run at famous beaches for their quality waves: The Canary Islands, France, Portugal, Spain, England, Ireland, and the Azores Islands. All organized contests are at the best surfing beaches and at the best time of the year.

The events attract more than 200 professional surfers from Europe and other international competitors, bringing together athletes from multiple countries to compete.

== WSL Membership ==
Membership to the WSL is only available to individuals.

== WSL Europe Sanctioned Tours ==
- WSL Europe Men's Qualifying Series
- WSL Europe Women's Qualifying Series
- WSL Europe Men and Women's Junior Qualifying Series
- WSL Europe Men and Women's Longboard Qualifying Series and
- WSL Europe Specialty Events.

=== WSL Qualifying Series events ===
A WSL QS 10,000 event is held at premium venues with a restricted field and offers 10,000 WSL Rankings points.

WSL QS 1,000 - QS 6,000 events are a lower level of competition, compared to an WSL QS 10,000 event, with their importance indicated by how many points they are assigned: more points means generally better competition and prize money.

=== WSL Junior events ===
In 2013, 6 Men and 2 Women will represent Europe at the WSL Junior Championships. Junior events in Europe decide those qualifiers every year. Surfers must be under-18 years old to enter those events.

=== WSL Longboard events ===
Same as for the Junior Tour, those events offer the possibility for the Best European longboarders to qualify for the coveted WSL Longboard Championship events.

== Rules ==
=== Judging ===
In contests surfers will be scored on a scale of 0.1 to 10.0, these scores will be broken up into increments of one-tenth. The following scale can be use in order to relate descriptions with the score:

- 0–1.9 = Poor
- 2.0–3.9 = Fair
- 4.0–5.9 = Average;
- 6.0–7.9 = Good
- 8.0–10.0 = Excellent

=== Judging criteria ===
Judges will base the previous score on how successfully surfers display these following elements in each wave:

- Commitment and degree of difficulty
- Innovative and progressive maneuvers
- Combination of major maneuvers
- Variety of maneuvers
- Speed, power and flow

Some of these elements may be more or less important based on the surfing conditions and the surfing area. This criterion is also different to that in longboarding competitions. All of this is focused on creating some type consistency that can be seen throughout the many different events.

The events themselves are previously declared QS 1,000 - QS 10,000 events; among other things this ranking shows what numbers of judges which are required at the event. QS 1,000 - QS 3,000 Qualifying Series events are required to have a six judge panel with four judges on each heat. A QS 4,000 - QS 6,000 Qualifying Series event requires seven judges with five of those judges on each heat. At QS 5,000 - QS 10,000 Qualifying Series events there are only allowed to be 3 judges from any one region. This is then limited to two at any world championship events. All events also require an WSL approved head judge who has the ability to make corrections to errors or any other events that may have affected the results.

=== Rules ===
There are many rules out in the water which all revolve around the idea of right of way. A surfer has right of way if he or she is closer to the area where the wave is breaking, this is more commonly referred to as having the inside position. If another surfer takes off in front of the surfer which has the inside position then interference will be called and penalties will be enacted. In most circumstances it does not matter who stood up first but who has the inside position.

A surfer can also be found guilty of inference if they catch more than their maximum number of waves in a heat and that this takes away from the other competitors ability to catch waves. A competitor is also not allowed to interfere with another competitor's paddling and maneuvering for a wave.

The rules of right-a-way vary slightly with the type of break. Point Breaks will always have a consistent direct of what is inside, that is the person further up the line will have right-away. In a single peak situation where there is both a left and a right two people are able to be on the wave at the same time provided that one goes left and one goes right and that neither crosses the path of the other to go one direction. If this does happen then the surfer who stood up first will get the right-a-way. On a multi peaked wave where the wave eventually comes together both peaks can be surfed until the surfers come together, when they do the surfer who stood up first has right-a-way and the other must maneuver to get off the wave without interrupting the other surfer.

In a one-on-one competition priority can be declared by the Head Judge. Once the person with priority has paddled for a wave priority is then turned over to the next person until that person does the same. The person with second priority can paddles for waves as long as it does not interfere with the other person and will only lose their priority if they catch a wave.

A surfer who has already taken off or obtained possession of a wave maintains this position until the end of their ride. If another surfer takes off on the inside of this surfer then this person does not obtain priority and is considered to be snaking. If this surfer does not hurt the other surfers ride then both people can be scored based. If the judges determine that the snaking did interfere then the person will be penalized. Interference penalties are called by the judges and must have a majority to be declared an actual penalty. Interferences are shown as triangles on the score cards in various different ways depending on when or where in the heat they were made. If three or more waves are being scored then one wave will be dropped off the score card. If only the top two waves are being scored then 50% of the second best scored wave will be taken off. If a surfer has more than one then 50% of the best waves score will be taken off also. The surfer who has been interfered with will be allowed an additional wave to their maximum as long as it is within the time limit. If a surfer interferes more than twice in a heat then they must leave the competition area.

== WSL Europe Champions ==
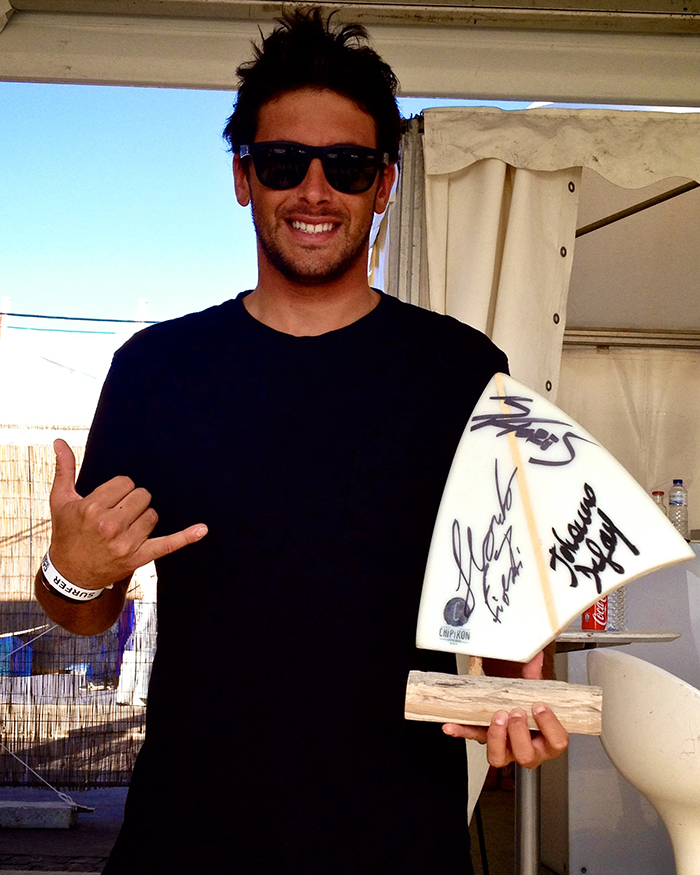
Jeremy Flores of France, 2013 WSL Europe Men's Champion

Year	WSL Europe Senior Men's Series	WSL Europe Senior Women's Series
2017	Jorgann Couzinet (FRA)	Carol Henrique (POR)
2016	Jonathan Gonzalez (ESP)	Pauline Ado (FRA)
2015	Pedro Henrique (POR)	Pauline Ado (FRA)
2014	Joan Duru (FRA)	Pauline Ado (FRA)
2013	Jérémy Florès (FRA)	Johanne Defay (FRA)
2012	Marlon Lipke (DEU)	Pauline Ado (FRA)
2011	Romain Cloitre (FRA)	Justine Dupont (FRA)
2010	Marc Lacomare (FRA)	Pauline Ado (FRA)
2009	Joan Duru (FRA)	Lee-Ann Curren (FRA)
2008	Tim Boal (FRA)	Justine Dupont (FRA)
2007	Aritz Aranburu (ESP)	Lee-Ann Curren (FRA)
2006	Patrick Beven (FRA)	Caroline Sarran (FRA)
2005	Patrick Beven (FRA)	Caroline Sarran (FRA)
2004	Justin Mujica (PRT)	Caroline Sarran (FRA)
2003	Patrick Beven (FRA)	
2002	Eric Rebiere (FRA)	
2001	Eneko Acero (ESP)	
2000	Eric Rebiere (FRA)	Patricia Rossi (PYF)

Year	WSL Europe Junior Men's Series	WSL Europe Junior Women's Series
2017	Kauli Vaast (PYF)	Teresa Bonvalot (POR)
2016	Titouan Boyer (FRA)	Teresa Bonvalot (POR)
2015	Nelson Cloarec (FRA)	Juliette Brice (FRA)
2014	Vasco Ribeiro (POR)	Tessa Thyssen (FRA)
2013	Leonardo Fioravanti (ITA)	Johanne Defay (FRA)
2012	Ramzi Boukhiam (MAR)	Cannelle Bulard (FRA)
2011	Medi Veminardi (REU)	Johanne Defay (FRA)
2010	Charly Martin (GLP)	Pauline Ado (FRA)
2009	Marc Lacomare (FRA)	Johanne Defay (FRA)
2008	Maxime Huscenot (FRA)	Alizé Arnaud (FRA)
2007	Romain Cloitre (FRA)	Pauline Ado (FRA)
2006	Joan Duru (FRA)	
2005	Jérémy Florès (FRA)	Pauline Ado (FRA)
2004	Marlon Lipke (DEU)	
2000	Patrick Beven (FRA)	

Year	WSL Europe Longboard Men's	WSL Europe Longboard Women's
2018	Edouard Delpero (FRA)	Justine Dupont (FRA)
2017	Antoine Delpero (FRA)	Alice Lemoigne (FRA)
2016	Antoine Delpero (FRA)	Alice Lemoigne (FRA)
2015	Antoine Delpero (FRA)	Alice Lemoigne (FRA)
2014	Edouard Delpero (FRA)	Justine Dupont (FRA)
2013	No Event	No Event
2012	Antoine Delpero (FRA)	Alice Lemoigne (FRA)
2011	Ben Skinner (GBR)	Emilie Libier (FRA)
2010	Antoine Delpero (FRA)	Estitxu Estremo (EUK)
2009	Ben Skinner (GBR)	Candice O'Donnell (GBR)
2008	Michel Demont (PYF)	Claire Karabatsos (FRA)
2007	Michel Demont (PYF)	Claire Karabatsos (FRA)
2006	Christos Roupas (GRE)	Claire Karabatsos (FRA)
2005	Michel Demont (PYF)	Claire Karabatsos (FRA)
2004	Michel Demont (PYF)	Claire Karabatsos (FRA)
2003	Michel Demont (PYF)	Claire Karabatsos (FRA)

== See also ==
- World Surf League
