= Yolanda Hopkins =

Portuguese surfer (born 1998)

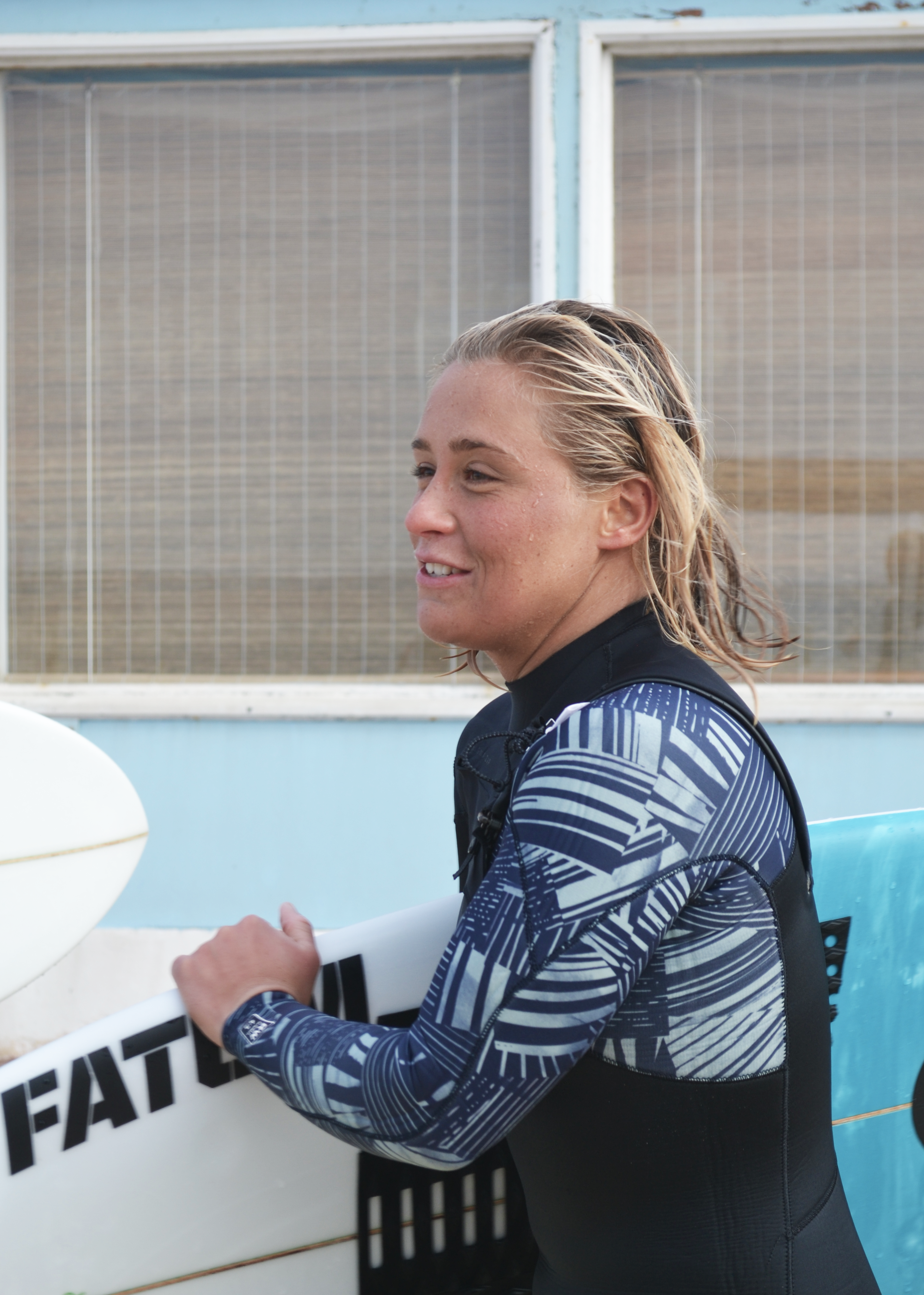
- Hopkins walking back from a training session in 2021

Personal information
- Born: 2 June 1998 (age 28) Faro, Portugal
- Height: 158 cm (5 ft 2 in)
- Weight: 55 kg (121 lb)

Surfing career
- Sport: Surfing
- Major achievements: 5th place at the 2020 Summer Olympics; Vice-Champion of the 2021 ISA World Surfing Games

Surfing specifications
- Stance: Regular
Medal record
World Games
Silver medal – second place	2021 La Libertad	Women
Silver medal – second place	2025 Surf City	Women
Bronze medal – third place	2021 La Libertad	Team

Yolanda Hopkins Sequeira (born 2 June 1998), known as Yolanda Hopkins or Yolanda Sequeira, is a Portuguese professional surfer. At club level she represents Clube Naval de Portimão. She qualified for the 2024 Olympic Games.

== Early life ==
Hopkins was born to a Portuguese father and Welsh mother. She developed an interest in surfing at the age of eight.

== Career ==
Hopkins bagged the Best Wave Award at the 2019 Portugal Surf Awards and also won the Tiago Pires award in the same year.

She claimed second position at the 2021 ISA World Surfing Games which qualified her for the 2020 Summer Olympics, the first Olympic games to include surfing as a sport.

She represented Portugal at the 2020 Summer Olympics which also marked her debut appearance at the Olympics. She qualified for the quarterfinals of the women's shortboard event. After making it to the quarterfinals, she was defeated by Bianca Buitendag of South Africa.

== Career Victories ==
WSL Challenger Series Wins
Year	Event	Venue	Country
2025	Banco do Brasil Saquarema Pro	Saquarema, Rio de Janeiro, Brazil	Brazil

WQS Wins
Year	Event	Venue	Country
2023	Animal Pro	Fistral Beach, Cornwall	England
2023	Rip Curl Pro Search Taghazout Bay	Anchor Point, Taghazout Bay	Morocco
2022	Rip Curl Pro Anglet	Chambre d'Amour, Anglet	France
2022	Animal Pro	Fistral Beach, Cornwall	England
2019	Roxy Open	Fistral Beach, Cornwall	England
