= Leilani McGonagle =

Costa Rican surfer

Personal information
- Born: 14 November 1999 (age 26) Pavón, Costa Rica

Surfing career
- Sport: Surfing
- Major achievements: Qualification for 2020 Summer Olympics

Surfing specifications
- Stance: Goofy
Medal record
Women's surfing
Representing Costa Rica
Competition
Pan American Games
Bronze medal – third place	2023 Santiago	Shortboard
World Surfing Games
Silver medal – second place	2015 Popoyo	Women

Leilani McGonagle (born 14 November 1999) is a Costa Rican professional surfer who competes in the World Surf League. Her brother Noe Mar McGonagle is also a professional surfer.

== Early life ==
She was born to a British father and an American mother. She was diagnosed with scoliosis after her birth. Before she could walk, her parents pushed her into her first wave. Her father was also a surfer who grew up engaging in the sport of surfing in San Clemente. Her father later moved from the United States to Costa Rica after finishing his studies at the high school.

== Career ==
During her junior career, she emerged as a North American junior champion. She was adjudged as the Surfer of the Year at the Costa Rica Surfing Awards in 2016 and 2017.

She qualified for the 2020 Summer Olympics following her performance at the 2021 ISA World Surfing Games. Incidentally, surfing was included for the first time in Olympics for the Tokyo Games. She dedicated her Olympic qualification achievement to her friend and Salvadoran surfer Katherine Díaz Hernández who died in early 2021 when she was struck by lightning.

She represented Costa Rica at the 2020 Summer Olympics which also marked her debut appearance at the Olympics. She was eliminated in round 2 of the women's shortboard event.
