= Leandro Usuna =

Argentine surfer

Personal information
- Nationality: Argentina
- Born: 21 December 1987 (age 37); Mar del Plata, Argentina

Sport
- Sport: Surfing

Olympic medal record

Men's surfing

Representing Argentina

World Games
Gold medal – first place	2014 Punta Rocas	Men
Gold medal – first place	2016 Jacó	Men

Leandro Usuna (born 21 December 1987) is an Argentine surfer. He competed in the 2020 Summer Olympics.
