= Nic von Rupp =

Portuguese surfer (born 1990)

Personal information
- Born: Nicolaus von Rupp; August 2, 1990 (age 35) Lisbon, Portugal
- Years active: 2004–present
- Height: 5 ft 10 in (1.78 m)
- Weight: 160 lb (73 kg)

Surfing career
- Sport: Surfing

Surfing specifications
- Favorite waves: Mullaghmore, Ireland
- Favorite maneuvers: Tuberide

Nic von Rupp (born Nicolaus von Rupp; August 2, 1990) is a professional surfer from Portugal, who specializes in big wave riding. In November 2020, von Rupp reportedly surfed some of the biggest waves ever ridden at Nazaré Beach in the Costa de Prata ("Silver Coast") region of Central Western Portugal (one of the world's premier big wave locations).

== Early life ==
Von Rupp was born in Lisbon, Portugal, the son of a German father and Swiss mother, and grew up in the town of Praia Grande in the municipality of Sintra (about thirty miles from Lisbon). Von Rupp possesses German, American, Swiss and Portuguese passports and is known to speak several languages fluently.

== Surfing ==
Von Rupp began surfing at the age of 9, and began competing soon afterward. During his teen years, he won several Portuguese national surfing titles and specialty events and made his debut on the World Qualifying Series surfing tour in 2009. Around the turn of the decade, von Rupp began to change the direction of his career from strictly small wave competitive surfing to the pursuit of big wave riding as well.

In 2013, he won both the Perfect Chapter and the Pawa Tube Fest events and in 2015 he finished in second place at the ISA World Surfing Games at Playa Popoyo, Nicaragua. Nic von Rupp has twice been a World Surf League "Big Wave Performance Of The Year" finalist.

As a big wave rider, the surfer spends significant time in pursuit of riding giant swells. In 2019, Nic von Rupp starred in the short documentary film called "Brusco" which followed the surfer's big wave travels between Portugal, Ireland, California and Hawaii.
