= Midget Farrelly =

Australian surfer

Bernard 'Midget' Farrelly
- Born: Bernard Farrelly; 13 September 1944; Sydney, New South Wales, Australia
- Died: 6 August 2016 (aged 71); Royal North Shore Hospital
- Other name: Midget
- Occupations: Surfer, designer, shaper, board maker
- Known for: First world surfing champion. Farrelly Surfboards
- Height: 5 ft 8 in (1.73 m)
- Spouse: Beverlie
- Children: 3 - Priscilla, Johanna and Lucy.

Bernard "Midget" Farrelly AM (13 September 1944 – 6 August 2016) was the first world surfing champion.

Farrelly, was the first Australian to win a major surfing title, the 1962 Makaha International Surfing Championships, the unofficial world surfing championship of the day. In 1964 he won the inaugural World Surfing Championship at Manly Beach in Sydney.

Farrelly was also the first president, in 1961, of Australia's oldest surfboard riders club, Dee Why Surfing Fraternity, which still operates under the same name today. He presented a ten-part television series about surfing in Australia, The Midget Farrelly Surf Show, for the ABC in 1967.

Farrelly was inducted into the Sport Australia Hall of Fame in 1985 and into the Surfing Walk of Fame at California's Huntington Beach in 2007. Farrelly died on 6 August 2016, aged 71, from stomach cancer and liver failure.

Farrelly was posthumously inducted as a Member of the Order of Australia in the 2017 Queen's Birthday Honours.

Achievements
Preceded by -	ISF World Surfing Champion (men's); 1964	Succeeded by Felipe Pomar
