= 2026 ISA World Surfing Games =

Surfing event in Peru

- Venue: Punta Rocas
- Location: Province of Lima, Peru
- Date: 6–15 November 2026

The 2026 ISA World Surfing Games took place at Punta Rocas in the Province of Lima, Peru, from 6 to 15 November 2026. The event was organised by the International Surfing Association (ISA).

Australia's Ethan Ewing and Leihani Zoric won their first senior titles in the men's and women's events, respectively. Zoric became the youngest champion in the tournament history.

== Medal summary ==
=== Medallists ===
Event	Gold	Silver	Bronze
Men	Ethan Ewing; Australia	Lucca Mesinas; Peru	Miguel Tudela; Peru
Women	Leihani Zoric; Australia	Johanne Defay; France	Janire González Etxabarri; Spain
Team Points	Australia	Peru	United States

- Standings after the event

=== Medal table ===
* Host nation (Peru)

Rank	Nation	Gold	Silver	Bronze	Total
1	Australia (AUS)	3	0	0	3
2	Peru (PER)*	0	2	1	3
3	France (FRA)	0	1	0	1
4	Spain (ESP)	0	0	1	1
4	United States (USA)	0	0	1	1
Totals (5 entries)		3	3	3	9

== See also ==
- 2026 World Surf League
