= João Torrão =

Portuguese dressage rider (born 1993)

Personal information
- Full name: João Miguel Torrão
- Nationality: Portuguese
- Born: 25 May 1993 (age 33) Évora, Portugal
- Height: 1.73 m (5 ft 8 in)
- Weight: 56 kg (123 lb)

Sport
- Country: Portugal
- Sport: Equestrian
- Event: Dressage
- Coached by: Carl Hester, Coralie Baldry

João Miguel Torrão (born 25 May 1993) is a Portuguese dressage rider. He competed at the European Championships in 2019 and competed at the Olympic Games in Tokyo, where he finished 29th in the individual competition and 8th with the Portuguese Team. He holds also the Portuguese dressage records in the Grand Prix and Grand Prix Special with scoring over the 77% and 79% with his horse Equador.
