= Phyllis O'Donnell =

Australian surfer (1937–2024)

Personal information
- Born: 1937
- Died: 6 November 2024 (aged 87)

Surfing career
- Sport: Surfing

Phyllis O'Donnell (1937 – 6 November 2024) was an Australian surfer who became the first Women's World Surfing Champion. O'Donnell won the championship in 1964 at the age of 27. At the time, surfing was dominated by men, and her championship was regarded as a step forward for women's recognition in the sport. O'Donnell also won the women's division of the Australian National Titles in 1963, 1964, and 1965.

It has been widely reported that O'Donnell began longboard surfing in 1960 when she moved to Tweed Heads, New South Wales with her parents. In fact, her older sister had a boyfriend who surfed and had left his board at their home in Drummoyne, New South Wales when O'Donnell was in her late teens. Already keen bodysurfers at Manly Beach, the two young women took the board to Harbord. O'Donnell concentrated on paddling before taking to her feet. Her teacher was Snowy McAlister, the first inductee in the Australian Surfing Hall of Fame, and remained her mentor and friend until his death in 1987. By the age of 23, she was a seasoned rider and fell in love with Kirra, Queensland.

O'Donnell finished 6th in the World titles in California (1966), 3rd in Puerto Rico (1968), 3rd in Hawaii's Makaha International (1966); 3rd twice and 4th once in the Australian titles (1966, '70, and '71); and 2nd place at Bells Beach, Victoria (1969), riding short boards from 1968 onwards.

In the late 1960s, O'Donnell worked for Dewey Weber, a surfboard manufacturer in California. Returning home to compete, she won the last of her 8 Queensland surfing titles. She retired from competition in 1974, and two years later was inducted into the Australian Surfing Hall of Fame. In 2014, she was inducted into the Surfing Walk of Fame in Huntington Beach, California.

O'Donnell died on 6 November 2024, at the age of 87.

== Books ==
- Surf's Up: The Girl's Guide to Surfing by Louise Southerden, Random House, 2005, ISBN 978-0-345-47661-6.
- The Encyclopedia of Surfing by Matt Warshaw, Houghton Mifflin Harcourt, 2005, ISBN 978-0-156-03251-3.
