= Rodrigo Torres =

Portuguese dressage rider (born 1977)

Personal information
- Full name: Rodrigo Moura Torres
- Nationality: Portuguese
- Born: 29 March 1977 (age 49) Portalegre, Portugal
- Height: 1.86 m (6 ft 1 in)
- Weight: 76 kg (168 lb)

Sport
- Country: Portugal
- Sport: Equestrian
- Event: Dressage
- Coached by: Kyra Kyrklund

Achievements and titles
- Olympic finals: 2020 Olympic Games
- Regional finals: 2019 European Championships

Rodrigo Moura Torres (born 29 March 1977) is a Portuguese dressage rider. He competed at the 2019 FEI European Championships, and competed for the Portuguese team at the 2020 Tokyo Olympics, finished 16th in the individual final and 8th with the Portuguese Team.

== Career ==
Rodrigo Torres began riding at age three at his family's farm in Alter do Chão. The farm has been in the family since the 1800s. Torres started competing at international level in 2012. His higher level breakthrough however began in 2017, when he started campaigning Lusitano-bred Fogoso. Torres and Fogoso were named reserve for the Portuguese team for the 2018 World Equestrian Games, but when a spot opened up Torres declined to go as he felt Fogoso was too young at age eight.

In 2019, Torres and Fogoso made their championships debut at the 2019 Europeans in Rotterdam. Torres placed 24th individually, and in the process helped Portugal achieve a team qualification for the 2020 Summer Olympics. Later that year, Torres won gold during the National Championships in Lisbon.

In 2021, Torres and Fogoso got officially named to represent Portugal at the delayed Tokyo Olympic Games. In Tokyo he made it to the Individual final where he finished 16th.

== Personal life ==
Torres is married to Portuguese Dressage rider Maria Pais do Amaral. He runs the Coudelaria Torres Vaz Freire stud farm in Alter do Chão with his wife and father Carlos. Rodrigo Torres has also a daughter.

== Programs ==
Horse	Freestyle
Fogoso	Money; Us and Them; Another Brick in the Wall by Pink Floyd, performed by the London Philharmonic Orchestra
