= 2021 ISA World Surfing Games =

- Venue: La Bocana and El Sunzal
- Location: Surf City, El Salvador
- Date: 29 May – 6 June 2021

The 2021 ISA World Surfing Games took place across the La Bocana and El Sunzal waves at Surf City, El Salvador, from 29 May to 6 June 2021. The event was originally scheduled to be held from 9 to 17 May 2020 but was postponed due to the COVID-19 pandemic. The event was organised by the International Surfing Association (ISA).

== Medal summary ==
=== Medallists ===
Event	Gold	Silver	Bronze
Men	Joan Duru; France	Kanoa Igarashi; Japan	Jérémy Florès; France
Women	Sally Fitzgibbons; Australia	Yolanda Sequeira; Portugal	Teresa Bonvalot; Portugal
Team Points	France; Michel Bourez; Joan Duru; Jérémy Florès; Pauline Ado; Cannelle Bulard; Vahiné Fierro	Japan; Kanoa Igarashi; Shun Murakami; Hiroto Ohhara; Mahina Maeda; Shino Matsuda; Amuro Tsuzuki	Portugal; Miguel Blanco; Frederico Morais; Vasco Ribeiro; Teresa Bonvalot; Carolina Mendes; Yolanda Sequeira

- Standings after the event

=== Medal table ===
* Host nation (El Salvador)

Rank	Nation	Gold	Silver	Bronze	Total
1	France (FRA)	2	0	1	3
2	Australia (AUS)	1	0	0	1
3	Japan (JPN)	0	2	0	2
4	Portugal (POR)	0	1	2	3
Totals (4 entries)		3	3	3	9

== Participating nations ==
- Afghanistan
- Algeria
- American Samoa
- Argentina
- Australia
- Barbados
- Belgium
- Brazil
- Canada
- Chile
- Chinese Taipei
- Colombia
- Costa Rica
- Denmark
- Dominican Republic
- Ecuador
- El Salvador
- France
- Germany
- Great Britain
- Greece
- Guatemala
- Hungary
- Indonesia
- Iran
- Ireland
- Israel
- Italy
- Jamaica
- Japan
- Mexico
- Morocco
- Netherlands
- New Zealand
- Nicaragua
- Panama
- Peru
- Philippines
- Portugal
- Puerto Rico
- Russian Surfing Federation
- Senegal
- South Africa
- Spain
- Sweden
- Switzerland
- Turkey
- US Virgin Islands
- Ukraine
- United States
- Uruguay
- Venezuela

== Results ==
Individual Places - Men's Division
Place	Country	Name	Points Earned
1	France	Joan Duru	1000
2	Japan	Kanoa Igarashi	860
3	France	Jeremy Flores	730
4	Japan	Hiroto Ohhara	670
5	Germany	Leon Glatzer	610
6	Japan	Shun Murakami	583
7	Peru	Lucca Mesinas	555
8	Peru	Miguel Tudela	528
9	Chile	Manuel Selman	500
9	Indonesia	I Ketut Agus Aditya Putra	500
11	Portugal	Vasco Ribeiro	475
11	Australia	Owen Wright	475
13	Spain	Aritz Aranburu	450
13	El Salvador	Bryan Perez	450
13	South Africa	Matt McGillivray	450
16	Panama	Isauro Elizondo	413
16	Australia	Julian Wilson	413
16	France	Michel Bourez	413
19	Costa Rica	Noé Mar McGonagle	390
19	Venezuela	Francisco Bellorin	390
19	Italy	Leonardo Fioravanti	390
22	United States	Ryan Huckabee	375
22	Morocco	Ramzi Boukhiam	375
22	Peru	Alonso Correa	375
25	United Kingdom	Luke Dillon	360
25	Brazil	Italo Ferreira	360
25	Israel	Yoni Klein	360
25	Indonesia	Rio Waida	360
25	Mexico	Alan Cleland	360
25	Brazil	Ítalo Ferreira	360
31	Mexico	Jhony Corzo	330
31	Portugal	Frederico Morais	330
31	Portugal	Miguel Blanco	330
31	Argentina	Jose Ignacio Gundesen	330
31	Panama	Tao Rodriguez	330
31	Puerto Rico	Dwight Pastrana	330
37	Barbados	Joshua Burke	300
37	Mexico	Dylan Southworth	300
37	Ecuador	Jonathan Zambrano	300
37	Germany	Dylan Groen	300
37	United Kingdom	Stanley Norman	300
37	Nicaragua	Cesar Amador	300
37	Canada	Shane Campbell	300
37	Sweden	Kian Martin	300
37	Chile	Guillermo Satt	300
46	Spain	Jonathan Gonzalez	255
46	Canada	Cody Young	255
46	Argentina	Leandro Usuna	255
46	Philippines	John Mark Tokong	255
46	Indonesia	Oney Anwar	255
46	Ireland	Gearoid McDaid	255
46	Brazil	Filipe Toledo	255
46	Morocco	Aboubakr Bouaouda	255
46	Morocco	Selyann Zouhir	255
55	Jamaica	Elishama Beckford	210
55	United States	Dimitri Poulos	210
55	Costa Rica	Anthony Fillingim	210
55	Costa Rica	Carlos Muñóz	210
55	Panama	Jean Gonzalez	210
55	Australia	Ryan Callinan	210
55	Germany	Marlon Lipke	210
55	Netherlands	Remi Petersen	210
55	Uruguay	Marco Giorgi	210
64	Puerto Rico	Ricardo Delgado	165
64	Colombia	Giorgio Gomez	165
64	Chile	Maximiliano Cross	165
64	Netherlands	Tom Boelsma	165
64	Venezuela	Jose Lopez	165
64	Sweden	Cristian Portelli	165
64	American Samoa	Liam Wilson	165
64	Uruguay	Sebastian Olarte	165
64	Spain	Andy Criere	165
73	El Salvador	Porfirio Miranda	144
73	Italy	Angelo Bonomelli	144
73	Barbados	Bruce Mackie	144
73	Netherlands	Kaspar Hamminga	144
73	Uruguay	Lucas Madrid	144
73	Colombia	Jefferson Tascon	144
73	Nicaragua	Elton Sanchez	144
73	Sweden	Greyson Grant	144
73	Switzerland	Michael Zaugg	144
73	Venezuela	Rafael Pereira	144
73	Philippines	Edito Alcala Jr	144
73	Guatemala	Élder Vega	144
73	Ecuador	Israel Barona	144
73	Canada	Kalum Temple	144
73	Philippines	Rogelio Esquievel Jr	144
73	Barbados	Che Allan	144
73	United States	Taj Lindblad	144
73	Belgium	Jack Verbraeken	144
91	United States Virgin Islands	Jon Gazi	108
91	Puerto Rico	Manny Valentín	108
91	Israel	Eithan Osborne	108
91	Iran	Tom Rezvan	108
91	Senegal	Assane Mbengue	108
91	Ukraine	Iaroslav Dombrovskyi	108
91	Ireland	Rory Tuohy	108
91	Dominican Republic	Cristian Padilla	108
91	Denmark	Oliver Hartkopp	108
91	Greece	Dimitri Papavassiliou	108
91	Nicaragua	Jackson Obando	108
91	Brazil	Gabriel Medina	108
91	Israel	Ido Arkin	108
91	Belgium	Dean Vandewalle	108
91	Jamaica	Garren Pryce	108
91	Russia	Nikita Avdeev	108
91	Senegal	Cherif Fall	108
91	Ecuador	Carlos Goncalves	108
109	Belgium	Matisse Verworst	81
109	Switzerland	Fantin Habashi	81
109	Russia	Sergey Rasshivaev	81
109	Guatemala	Carlos Escobar	81
109	Chinese Taipei	Ming-Jang Liu	81
109	Afghanistan	Afridun Amu	81
109	Denmark	Christoffer Holler	81
109	Greece	Perry Siganos	81
109	United Kingdom	Harry Cromwell	81
109	Italy	Edoardo Papa	81
109	Russia	Egor Volkov	81
109	Dominican Republic	Saori Perez	81
109	Colombia	Anderson Tascon	81
109	Turkey	Tunc Ucyildiz	81
109	Guatemala	Jose Marroquin	81
109	Iran	Salar Gheysari	81
109	Switzerland	Swen Zaugg	81
109	Hungary	Gergely Balogh	81
127	Jamaica	Icah Wilmot	63
127	Ukraine	Vasyl Kordysh	63
127	Turkey	Yasin Pehlivan	63
127	Ireland	Oisin Campbell	63
127	United States Virgin Islands	Tommy Gibney	63
127	Denmark	Lucas Bay	63
127	Senegal	Sidy Camara	63
127	Dominican Republic	Leandro Castillo	63
127	El Salvador	Samuel Arenivar	63

Individual Places - Women's Division
Place	Point	Name NOC	Place
1	Australia	Sally Fitzgibbons	1000
2	Portugal	Yolanda Sequeira	860
3	Portugal	Teresa Bonvalot	730
4	Peru	Daniella Rosas	670
5	Costa Rica	Leilani McGonagle	610
6	France	Pauline Ado	583
7	United States	Alyssa Spencer	555
8	Japan	Mahina Maeda	528
9	Japan	Amuro Tsuzuki	500
9	France	Vahiné Fierro	500
11	Argentina	Lucia Indurain	475
11	New Zealand	Paige Hareb	475
13	Canada	Bethany Zelasko	450
13	Uruguay	Delfina Morosini	450
15	Israel	Anat Lelior	425
15	Australia	Stephanie Gilmore	425
17	Nicaragua	Candelaria Resano	400
17	Germany	Noah Klapp	400
17	Indonesia	Taina Angel Izquierdo	400
17	Portugal	Carolina Mendes	400
21	Chile	Estela López	380
21	Germany	Rachel Presti	380
21	Peru	Melanie Giunta	380
21	Chile	Lorena Fica	380
25	Spain	Ariane Ochoa	360
25	Philippines	Nilbie Blancada	360
25	Italy	Claire Bevilacqua	360
25	United Kingdom	Ellie Turner	360
29	Canada	Paige Alms	340
29	France	Cannelle Bulard	340
29	Mexico	Shelby Detmers	340
29	New Zealand	Saffi Vette	340
33	United Kingdom	Lucy Campbell	320
33	Italy	Emily Gussoni	320
33	Panama	Enilda Alonso	320
33	Argentina	Ornela Pellizzari	320
33	Germany	Camilla Kemp	320
33	Nicaragua	Valentina Resano	320
33	Spain	Nadia Erostarbe	320
33	Barbados	Chelsea Tuach	320
41	Mexico	Asaya Brusa	280
41	Indonesia	Kailani Johnson	280
41	Spain	Leticia Canales	280
41	Italy	Giada Legati	280
41	Argentina	Josefina Ane	280
41	Japan	Shino Matsuda	280
41	Puerto Rico	Faviola Alcalá	280
41	Uruguay	Marcela Machado	280
49	Israel	Noa Lelior	240
49	Ecuador	Génesis Borja	240
49	Colombia	Isabella Gomez	240
49	Peru	Sofia Mulanovich	240
49	Canada	Mathea Olin	240
49	Chile	Jessica Anderson	240
49	Netherlands	Mirna Boelsma	240
49	Israel	Advah Bar Sade	240
57	Colombia	Margarita Conde	200
57	Puerto Rico	Havanna Cabrero	200
57	United Kingdom	Emily Currie	200
57	Ecuador	Dominic Barona	200
57	El Salvador	Brenda Alvarez	200
57	Philippines	Daisy Valdez	200
57	Morocco	Lilias Tebbai	200
57	Costa Rica	Eva Luna Woodland	200
65	Netherlands	Dominga Valdes	160
65	Ecuador	Susana Berrezueta	160
65	Indonesia	Dhea Natasya	160
65	Mexico	Summer Sívori	160
65	Venezuela	Maria Torrealba	160
65	Venezuela	Rosaura Alvarez	160
65	Switzerland	Alicia Martinet	160
65	El Salvador	Vanessa Cortez	160
65	El Salvador	Evelin Centeno	160
65	Switzerland	Fabienne Sutter	160
65	Belgium	Rheanna Rosenbaum	160
65	Venezuela	Rosanny Alvarez	160
65	Barbados	Chelsea Roett	160
65	American Samoa	Lucille Jarrard	160
65	Uruguay	Sofia Alfonso	160
65	Netherlands	Julia Van Rooij	160
81	United States	Carissa Moore	128
81	Colombia	Angelina Decesare	128
81	United States	Caroline Marks	128
81	Sweden	Emmy Wilén	128
81	Denmark	Katinka Thane Soerensen	128
81	Belgium	Régine Ruppol	128
81	Switzerland	Fanny Bühlmann	128
81	Panama	Isabella Goodwin	128
81	Costa Rica	Brisa Hennessy	128
81	Brazil	Tatiana Weston-Webb	128
81	Russian Surfing Federation	Elena Bolysova	128
81	Barbados	Gabrielle Gittens	128
81	Philippines	Vea Estrellado	128
81	Russian Surfing Federation	Anna Chudnenko	128
81	Senegal	Imane Signate	128
81	Chinese Taipei	Yun-Jung Chung	128
97	Guatemala	Tiziana Billy Prem	96
97	Puerto Rico	Mia Calderón	96
97	Dominican Republic	Feliz Astacio	96
97	Guatemala	Barbara Sandoval	96
97	Belgium	Camille Kindt	96
97	Ireland	Ayesha Garvey	96
97	Panama	Andrea Vlieg	96
97	Jamaica	Elim Beckford	96
97	Turkey	Aleyna Hadimoglu	96
97	Jamaica	Imani Wilmot	96
97	Denmark	Anne Sofie Andersen	96
97	Afghanistan	Urzala Weis	96
97	Sweden	Sanna Hörvallius	96
97	Guatemala	Karin Lone	96
97	Turkey	Ozlem Ada	96
97	Nicaragua	Maxima Resano	96
113	Dominican Republic	Joan Marie Bobea	77
113	Russian Surfing Federation	Tatiana Dudova	77
113	Ireland	Grace Doyle	77
113	Denmark	Mille Kristensen	77
113	Sweden	Deva Pérez Orviz	77
113	Ukraine	Anastasiia Temirbek	77
113	Brazil	Júlia Santos	77

== Olympic qualification ==
The event contributed towards qualification for the 2020 Olympics in Tokyo, where surfing will make its debut as an Olympic sport. The top five eligible men and top seven eligible women who had not already qualified via the 2019 World Surf League qualified for the Olympics, subject to a maximum of two surfers per National Olympic Committee in each of the men's and women's events.

Men's

- Hiroto Ohhara (JPN)
- Leon Glatzer (GER)
- Lucca Mesinas (PER)
- Miguel Tudela (PER)
- Manuel Selman (CHI)

Women's

- Yolanda Sequeira (POR)
- Teresa Bonvalot (POR)
- Daniella Rosas (PER)
- Leilani McGonagle (CRC)
- Pauline Ado (FRA)
- Mahina Maeda (JPN)
- Amuro Tsuzuki (JPN)
