= Pauline Ado =

French professional surfer (born 1991)

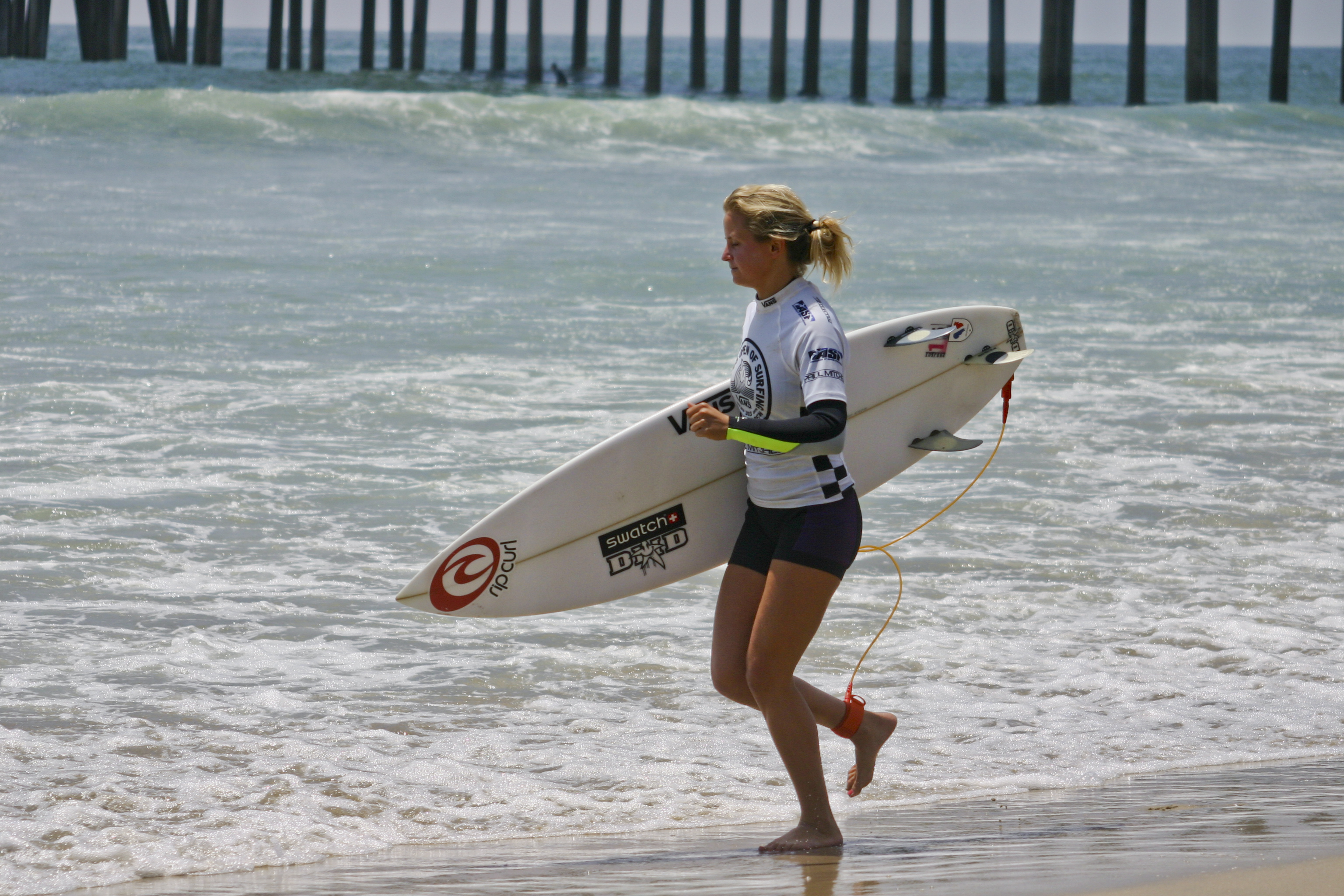
- Pauline Ado on 27 July 2013

Personal information
- Born: 14 February 1991 (age 35) Bayonne, Nouvelle-Aquitaine, France
- Height: 5 ft 7 in (1.70 m)
- Weight: 125 lb (57 kg)

Surfing career
- Sport: Surfing

Surfing specifications
- Stance: Regular (natural foot)
Medal record
Women's surfing
Representing France
World Games
Gold medal – first place	2017 Biarritz	Team
Gold medal – first place	2017 Biarritz	Women
Gold medal – first place	2021 La Bocana	Team
Silver medal – second place	2022 Huntington Beach	Women
Silver medal – second place	2023 La Bocana	Team
Bronze medal – third place	2016 Jacó	Women
Bronze medal – third place	2022 Huntington Beach	Team

Pauline Ado (born 14 February 1991) is a French professional surfer. She won a bronze medal for France at the World Surfing Championship.

== Early life ==
She was born on 14 February 1991 in Bayonne.

== Career ==
She won two junior championships in 2005. At the age of 17 she became the first non-Australian to win a junior world championship in 2009. In 2016, she is ranked 9 at QS ranking. She won a bronze medal at the 2016 ISA World Surfing Games, Playa Jaco, Jacó, in Costa Rica.
