= Erin Coscarelli =

American anchor

- Born: Los Angeles, California, U.S.
- Education: University of Southern California
- Occupation: Sportscaster/ Entertainment

Erin Michelle Coscarelli is an American anchor, who works for NFL Network. She was the host of NFL Network's weekday morning show, NFL HQ. She hosts Fantasy and Friends on NFL Network. Erin also appeared as a correspondent on ABC's "The Ultimate Surfer."

== Early years ==
Coscarelli was born in Los Angeles, California. She is of Italian descent. Erin later attended the University of Southern California and received a degree in Communications and Journalism. While at USC she was a member of both KUSC and Annenberg TV News.

== Career ==
Coscarelli began her career as sideline reporter for many sports networks including Fox Sports West, Pac-12 Network and NBC Sports Network. She also reported for ESPN where she covered the World Series of Poker and the Summer X Games. On May 6, 2013, she was hired by Comcast SportsNet Bay Area to be an anchor and reporter in which she covered many regional professional sports teams that includes Golden State Warriors, San Francisco 49ers and San Francisco Giants. In July 2014, she left CSN Bay Area to join NFL Network to become the host of the NFL Network's new morning show, NFL AM, with Rhett Lewis. In 2015, Coscarelli was the co-host with Cole Wright in the NFL Network's weekday morning show NFL HQ. She serves as the host of the DirecTV Fantasy Zone channel during football season.
