= Popoyo =

- Town
- Location in Nicaragua
- Coordinates: 11°28′23.33″N 86°7′37.19″W
- Country: Nicaragua
- Department: Rivas Department
- Time zone: UTC-6 (Nicaragua Standard Time)

Popoyo is a small beach town in the Tola municipality of the Rivas Department of Nicaragua.

== The 1992 Nicaraguan tsunami ==
On September 2, 1992, a magnitude 7.0 earthquake off the central coast of Nicaragua generated a tsunami that devastated Popoyo and many other communities on the Pacific coast. At least 116 people were killed, more than 68 missing and over 13,500 left homeless in Nicaragua. At least 1,300 houses and 185 fishing boats were destroyed along the west coast of Nicaragua.

== Surfing ==
Because of the country's consistent offshore winds surfing is a popular tourist attraction in the area.

- Popoyo Outer Reef is the most challenging wave in the area, and is advised for experts only. It is a powerful reef break that goes both left and right and offers long, powerful walls and sometimes a thick barrel section.
- Playa Santana is a consistent beach break 20 minutes from the town of Popoyo.
- The Popoyo Surf Zone is a miracle of points, beach and reef breaks that capture the power of the frequent south swells and adds an all day dose of offshore winds funneling in from Lake Nicaragua to create great surf.

== Geography ==
=== Climate ===
Popoyo has a tropical savanna climate (Köppen climate classification Aw) with a short dry season from January to April and a lengthy wet season from May to October. Temperatures remain steady throughout the year with the dry season being slightly cooler and range from 25.5 °C (77.9 °F) in January to 27.7 °C (81.9 °F) in May. The average annual precipitation is 1,345 millimetres (53 in).

Climate data for Popoyo, Nicaragua
Month	Jan	Feb	Mar	Apr	May	Jun	Jul	Aug	Sep	Oct	Nov	Dec	Year
Mean daily maximum °C (°F)	28.7 (83.7)	26.6 (79.9)	30.9 (87.6)	31.8 (89.2)	31.7 (89.1)	30.0 (86.0)	29.5 (85.1)	29.8 (85.6)	29.8 (85.6)	29.5 (85.1)	29.1 (84.4)	28.7 (83.7)	29.7 (85.4)
Daily mean °C (°F)	25.5 (77.9)	26.0 (78.8)	27.0 (80.6)	26.4 (79.5)	27.7 (81.9)	26.7 (80.1)	26.4 (79.5)	26.6 (79.9)	26.2 (79.2)	26.3 (79.3)	26.1 (79.0)	25.6 (78.1)	26.4 (79.5)
Mean daily minimum °C (°F)	23.0 (73.4)	23.2 (73.8)	23.9 (75.0)	24.8 (76.6)	24.9 (76.8)	24.3 (75.7)	24.3 (75.7)	24.1 (75.4)	23.6 (74.5)	23.8 (74.8)	23.8 (74.8)	23.4 (74.1)	23.9 (75.1)
Average precipitation mm (inches)	8 (0.3)	4 (0.2)	3 (0.1)	10 (0.4)	172 (6.8)	225 (8.9)	151 (5.9)	181 (7.1)	265 (10.4)	209 (8.2)	87 (3.4)	30 (1.2)	1,345 (52.9)
Average rainy days (≥ 1.0 mm)	2	1	0	1	10	16	14	15	22	17	10	5	113
Mean monthly sunshine hours	229.4	228.8	244.9	231.0	195.3	141.0	148.8	161.2	147.0	173.6	186.0	207.7	2,294.7
Source: Hong Kong Observatory

== See also ==
- Tourism in Nicaragua
