= Surfing at the 2020 Summer Olympics – Qualification =

Qualification for surfing at the 2020 Summer Olympics will be based on the performances at two editions of the ISA World Surfing Games, the World Surf League Championship Tour, and the Pan American Games. The 2020 Olympics were postponed to 2021 due to the COVID-19 pandemic. Twenty athletes per gender must qualify for the Games, with only a maximum of two each per NOC. Host nation Japan has been entitled to use a single quota place each in both men's and women's shortboard. If Japan directly qualifies in any of the tournaments, the host country place(s) shall be reallocated to the next highest ranked eligible athlete at the 2021 ISA World Surfing Games.

== Timeline ==
Event	Date	Venue
2019 Pan American Games	July 30 – August 4, 2019	(Peru) Lima
2019 World Surf League	April 3 – December 20, 2019	Various locations
2019 ISA World Surfing Games	September 7–15, 2019	(Japan) Miyazaki
2021 ISA World Surfing Games	May 29 – June 6, 2021	(El Salvador) El Sunzal & La Bocana
Re-allocation of unused quota places	TBD 2021	

== Qualification summary ==
Quota places will be allocated to the athletes in the following events:

- Host country: Japan is allocated 1 place in both men's and women's events. If at least one Japanese athlete has earned a qualification place through other events, the relevant host country place(s) shall be reallocated to the next highest ranked eligible athlete at the 2021 ISA World Surfing Games.
- 2019 World Surf League – the 10 highest ranked men and 8 highest ranked women will be awarded quota places.
- 2019 ISA World Surfing Games – the top finishers from each continent with the exception of the Americas will be awarded a quota place.
- 2019 Pan American Games – the top finisher in men's and women's events will be awarded a quota place.
- 2021 ISA World Surfing Games – the top 4 men and 7 women will be awarded quota places. If a NOC or National Olympic Committee qualifies more than the maximum number of athletes, the 2021 ISA World Surfing Games will prevail and any places earned from 2019 will be reawarded to the next highest finishing athlete(s). Each NOC is allowed to send a maximum of four athletes (two per gender) to the Olympic surfing competition.

=== Qualified countries ===
NOC	Men	Women	Total
Argentina	1		1
Australia	2	2	4
Brazil	2	2	4
Chile	1		1
Costa Rica		2	2
Ecuador		1	1
France	2	2	4
Germany	1		1
Indonesia	1		1
Israel		1	1
Italy	1		1
Japan	2	2	4
Morocco	1		1
New Zealand	1	1	2
Peru	2	2	4
Portugal	1	2	3
South Africa		1	1
United States	2	2	4
Total: 17 NOCs	20	20	40

== Events ==
=== Men's shortboard ===
Event	Places	Qualified surfer
Host NOC	n/a	Qualified through other event
2019 Pan American Games	1	Leandro Usuna (ARG)
2019 World Surf League	10	Julian Wilson (AUS); Owen Wright (AUS); Ítalo Ferreira (BRA); Gabriel Medina (BRA); Michel Bourez (FRA); Jérémy Florès (FRA); Leonardo Fioravanti (ITA); Kanoa Igarashi (JPN); Kolohe Andino (USA); John John Florence (USA)
2021 ISA World Surfing Games	5	Hiroto Ohhara (JPN); Leon Glatzer (GER); Lucca Mesinas (PER); Miguel Tudela (PER); Manuel Selman (CHI)
2019 ISA World Surfing Games – Africa	1	Ramzi Boukhiam (MAR)
2019 ISA World Surfing Games – Asia	1	Rio Waida (INA)
2019 ISA World Surfing Games – Europe	1	Frederico Morais (POR)
2019 ISA World Surfing Games – Oceania	1	Billy Stairmand (NZL)
Total	20	

=== Women's shortboard ===
Event	Places	Qualified surfer
Host NOC	n/a	Qualified through other event
2019 Pan American Games	1	Mimi Barona (ECU)
2019 World Surf League	8	Sally Fitzgibbons (AUS); Stephanie Gilmore (AUS); Silvana Lima (BRA); Tatiana Weston-Webb (BRA); Brisa Hennessy (CRC); Johanne Defay (FRA); Caroline Marks (USA); Carissa Moore (USA)
2021 ISA World Surfing Games	7	Yolanda Sequeira (POR); Teresa Bonvalot (POR); Daniella Rosas (PER); Leilani McGonagle (CRC); Pauline Ado (FRA); Mahina Maeda (JPN); Amuro Tsuzuki (JPN)
2019 ISA World Surfing Games – Africa	1	Bianca Buitendag (RSA)
2019 ISA World Surfing Games – Asia (reallocation)	1	Sofía Mulánovich (PER)
2019 ISA World Surfing Games – Europe	1	Anat Lelior (ISR)
2019 ISA World Surfing Games – Oceania	1	Ella Williams (NZL)
Total	20	
