= Peru at the 2020 Summer Olympics =

- IOC code: PER
- NOC: Peruvian Olympic Committee
- Website: www.coperu.org (in Spanish)

in Tokyo, Japan July 23, 2021 – August 8, 2021
- Competitors: 35 in 17 sports
- Flag bearers (opening): Daniella Rosas; Lucca Mesinas
- Flag bearer (closing): Alexandra Grande
- Medals: Gold 0 Silver 0 Bronze 0 Total 0

Summer Olympics appearances (overview)
- 1900; 1904–1932; 1936; 1948; 1952; 1956; 1960; 1964; 1968; 1972; 1976; 1980; 1984; 1988; 1992; 1996; 2000; 2004; 2008; 2012; 2016; 2020; 2024; 2028

Peru competed at the 2020 Summer Olympics in Tokyo. Originally scheduled to take place from 24 July to 9 August 2020, the Games were postponed to 23 July to 8 August 2021, because of the COVID-19 pandemic. Since the nation's official debut in 1936, Peruvian athletes have appeared in every edition of the Summer Olympic Games, except the 1952 Summer Olympics in Helsinki.

== Competitors ==
Sport	Men	Women	Total
Athletics	3	5	8
Badminton	0	1	1
Boxing	2	0	2
Cycling	1	0	1
Fencing	0	1	1
Gymnastics	0	1	1
Judo	1	0	1
Karate	0	1	1
Rowing	1	0	1
Sailing	1	4	5
Shooting	3	0	3
Skateboarding	1	0	1
Surfing	2	2	4
Swimming	1	1	2
Tennis	1	0	1
Weightlifting	1	0	1
Wrestling	1	0	1
Total	19	16	35

== Athletics ==
Peruvian athletes further achieved the entry standards, either by qualifying time or by world ranking, in the following track and field events (up to a maximum of 3 athletes in each event):

Key

- Note–Ranks given for track events are within the athlete's heat only
- Q = Qualified for the next round
- q = Qualified for the next round as a fastest loser or, in field events, by position without achieving the qualifying target
- NR = National record
- N/A = Round not applicable for the event
- Bye = Athlete not required to compete in the round

Track & road events
Men

Athlete	Event	Final	
Athlete	Event	Result	Rank
Cristhian Pacheco	Marathon	2:22:12	60
Luis Henry Campos	20 km walk	1:30:58	43
César Rodríguez	20 km walk	1:24:40	21

Women

Athlete	Event	Final	
Athlete	Event	Result	Rank
Jovana de la Cruz	Marathon	2:36:38	40
Gladys Tejeda	Marathon	2:34:21	27
Mary Luz Andía	20 km walk	1:35:25	24
Kimberly García	20 km walk	DNF	
Leyde Guerra	20 km walk	1:38:10	36

== Badminton ==
Peru entered one badminton player into the Olympic tournament. Former Youth Olympian Daniela Macías accepted a spare berth from the injured Olympic champion Carolina Marín of Spain, as the next highest-ranked shuttler vying for qualification in the women's singles, based on the BWF World Race to Tokyo Rankings as of June 15, 2021. This signifies the country's return to the sport for the first time since 1996.

Athlete	Event	Group stage			Elimination	Quarterfinal	Semifinal	Final / BM	
Athlete	Event	Opposition Score	Opposition Score	Rank	Opposition Score	Opposition Score	Opposition Score	Opposition Score	Rank
Daniela Macías	Women's singles	Ongbamrungphan (THA); L (4–21, 9–21)	Kuuba (EST); L (19–21, 13–21)	3	Did not advance				

== Boxing ==
Peru entered two male boxers to compete in each of the following weight classes in the Olympic tournament. With the cancellation of the 2021 Pan American Qualification Tournament in Buenos Aires, Argentina, Leodan Pezo finished among the top five in the men's lightweight category to secure his place in the Peruvian squad based on the IOC's Boxing Task Force Rankings for the Americas. Meanwhile, José Maria Lucar completed the nation's sporting lineup by topping the field of boxers vying for qualification from the Americas in the men's heavyweight category through the same system. This signifies the country's return to the sport for the first time since 1996.

Athlete	Event	Round of 32	Round of 16	Quarterfinals	Semifinals	Final	
Athlete	Event	Opposition Result	Opposition Result	Opposition Result	Opposition Result	Opposition Result	Rank
Leodan Pezo	Men's lightweight	Safiullin (KAZ); L 0–5	Did not advance				
José María Lúcar	Men's heavyweight	Bye	Abduljabbar (GER); L 0–5	Did not advance			

== Cycling ==
=== Road ===
Peru entered one rider to compete in the men's Olympic road race for the first time since Los Angeles 1984, by finishing in the top two but not yet qualifying, at the 2019 Pan American Championships in Mexico. This signifies the country's debut in the sport.

Athlete	Event	Time	Rank
Royner Navarro	Men's road race	Did not finish	

== Fencing ==
Peru entered one fencer into the Olympic competition. Beijing 2008 Olympian María Luisa Doig claimed a spot in the women's épée by winning the final match at the Pan American Zonal Qualifier in San José, Costa Rica. This signifies the country's return to the sport for the first time since 2008.

Athlete	Event	Round of 64	Round of 32	Round of 16	Quarterfinal	Semifinal	Final / BM	
Athlete	Event	Opposition Score	Opposition Score	Opposition Score	Opposition Score	Opposition Score	Opposition Score	Rank
María Luisa Doig	Women's épée	Bye	Kong (HKG); L 11–15	Did not advance				

== Gymnastics ==
=== Artistic ===
Peru entered one artistic gymnast into the Olympic competition. Rio 2016 Olympian Ariana Orrego received a spare berth from the women's apparatus events, as one of the twelve highest-ranked gymnasts who were neither part of the team nor qualified directly through the all-around, at the 2019 World Championships in Stuttgart, Germany. This signifies the country's debut in the sport.

Women

Athlete	Event	Qualification						Final					
Athlete	Event	Apparatus				Total	Rank	Apparatus				Total	Rank
Athlete	Event	V	UB	BB	F	Total	Rank	V	UB	BB	F	Total	Rank
Ariana Orrego	All-around	13.433	9.466	12.066	12.066	47.031	74	Did not advance					

== Judo ==
Peru qualified one judoka for the men's half-lightweight category (66 kg) at the Games. Rio 2016 Olympian Juan Postigos accepted a continental berth from the Americas as the nation's top-ranked judoka outside of a direct qualifying position in the IJF World Ranking List of June 28, 2021.

Athlete	Event	Round of 32	Round of 16	Quarterfinals	Semifinals	Repechage	Final / BM	
Athlete	Event	Opposition Result	Opposition Result	Opposition Result	Opposition Result	Opposition Result	Opposition Result	Rank
Juan Postigos	Men's −66 kg	Katz (AUS); L 00–10	Did not advance					

== Karate ==
Peru entered one karateka into the inaugural Olympic tournament. Alexandra Grande secured a place in the women's kumite 61-kg category, as the highest-ranked karateka vying for qualification from the Americas based on the WKD Olympic Rankings.

Athlete	Event	Round Robin					Semifinals	Final	
Athlete	Event	Opposition Result	Opposition Result	Opposition Result	Opposition Result	Rank	Opposition Result	Opposition Result	Rank
Alexandra Grande	Women's –61 kg	Serogina (UKR); L 1–6	Farouk (EGY); L 0–2	Preković (SRB); L 0–1	Sadini (MAR); W 3–1	4	Did not advance		

== Rowing ==
Peru qualified one boat in the men's single sculls for the Games by finishing fifth in the A-final and securing the second of five berths available at the 2021 FISA Americas Olympic Qualification Regatta in Rio de Janeiro, Brazil.

Athlete	Event	Heats		Repechage		Quarterfinals		Semifinals		Final	
Athlete	Event	Time	Rank	Time	Rank	Time	Rank	Time	Rank	Time	Rank
Álvaro Torres	Men's single sculls	7:07.92	3 QF	Bye		7:31.85	4 SC/D	7:02.49	1 FC	7:03.69	17

Qualification Legend: FA=Final A (medal); FB=Final B (non-medal); FC=Final C (non-medal); FD=Final D (non-medal); FE=Final E (non-medal); FF=Final F (non-medal); SA/B=Semifinals A/B; SC/D=Semifinals C/D; SE/F=Semifinals E/F; QF=Quarterfinals; R=Repechage

== Sailing ==
Peruvian sailors qualified one boat in each of the following classes through the 2018 Sailing World Championships, the class-associated Worlds, the 2019 Pan American Games, and the continental regattas.

Athlete	Event	Race													Net points	Final rank
Athlete	Event	1	2	3	4	5	6	7	8	9	10	11	12	M*	Net points	Final rank
Stefano Peschiera	Men's Laser	12	26	21	18	19	33	19	15	14	~~36~~	—N/a		EL	177	25
María Belén Bazo	Women's RS:X	14	13	~~17~~	15	8	5	12	12	11	15	11	14	EL	130	13
Paloma Schmidt	Women's Laser Radial	17	37	~~39~~	38	29	35	32	35	31	11	—N/a		EL	265	36
Diana Tudela; María Pia van Oordt	Women's 49erFX	19	18	~~UFD~~	19	18	17	17	18	16	16	5	11	EL	174	20

M = Medal race; EL = Eliminated – did not advance into the medal race

== Shooting ==
Peruvian shooters achieved quota places for the following events by their best finishes at the 2018 ISSF World Championships, the 2019 ISSF World Cup series, the 2019 Pan American Games, and the Championships of the Americas, as long as they obtained a minimum qualifying score (MQS) by May 31, 2020.

Athlete	Event	Qualification		Final	
Athlete	Event	Points	Rank	Points	Rank
Marko Carrillo	Men's 10 m air pistol	569	29	Did not advance	
Marko Carrillo	Men's 25 m rapid fire pistol	572	18	Did not advance	
Alessandro de Souza Ferreira	Men's trap	118	27	Did not advance	
Nicolás Pacheco	Men's skeet	122	8	Did not advance	

== Skateboarding ==
Peru entered one skateboarder into the Olympic tournament. Ángelo Caro was automatically selected among the top 16 eligible skateboarders in the men's street category based on the World Skate Olympic Rankings as of June 30, 2021.

Athlete	Event	Qualification		Final	
Athlete	Event	Score	Rank	Score	Rank
Ángelo Caro	Men's street	32.93	7 Q	32.87	5

== Surfing ==
Peru sent four surfers (two per gender) to compete in their respective races at the Games. Lucca Mesinas, Miguel Tudela, and Daniella Rosas secured the places on the Peruvian roster in the men's and women's shortboard races, respectively, with a top-two finish of their preliminary heats at the 2021 ISA World Surfing Games in El Salvador, while 2004 world champion Sofía Mulánovich accepted a spare berth previously allocated by Japan's Shino Matsuda, as the next highest-ranked surfer in the overall provisional rankings at the 2019 ISA World Surfing Games.

Athlete	Event	Round 1		Round 2		Round 3	Quarterfinal	Semifinal	Final / BM	
Athlete	Event	Score	Rank	Score	Rank	Opposition Result	Opposition Result	Opposition Result	Opposition Result	Rank
Lucca Mesinas	Men's shortboard	11.40	1 Q	Bye		Fioravanti (ITA); W 10.77–8.86	Wright (AUS); L 7.83–12.74	Did not advance		
Miguel Tudela	Men's shortboard	10.67	2 Q	Bye		Ohhara (JPN); L 10.00–9.63	Did not advance			
Sofía Mulánovich	Women's shortboard	7.80	3 q	9.36	3 Q	Moore (USA); L 10.34–9.90	Did not advance			
Daniella Rosas	Women's shortboard	7.50	4 q	8.14	5	Did not advance				

== Swimming ==
Peru received a universal invitation from FINA to send two top-ranked swimmers (one per gender) in their respective individual events to the Olympics, based on the FINA Points System of June 28, 2021.

Athlete	Event	Heat		Semifinal		Final	
Athlete	Event	Time	Rank	Time	Rank	Time	Rank
Joaquín Vargas	Men's 200 m freestyle	1:49.93	35	Did not advance			
Joaquín Vargas	Men's 400 m freestyle	3:52.94	25	—N/a		Did not advance	
McKenna DeBever	Women's 100 m backstroke	1:02.09	31	Did not advance			
McKenna DeBever	Women's 200 m individual medley	2:15.86	24	Did not advance			

== Tennis ==
Peru entered one tennis player into the Olympic tournament for the first time since the 2004 Athens. Following the late withdrawals of several tennis players, Juan Pablo Varillas (world no. 133) accepted a spare berth previously allocated by one of the original top 56 entrants to compete in the men's singles based on the ATP Entry Rankings of June 14, 2021.

Athlete	Event	Round of 64	Round of 32	Round of 16	Quarterfinals	Semifinals	Final / BM	
Athlete	Event	Opposition Score	Opposition Score	Opposition Score	Opposition Score	Opposition Score	Opposition Score	Rank
Juan Pablo Varillas	Men's singles	Schwartzman (ARG); L 5–7, 4–6	Did not advance					

== Weightlifting ==
Peru entered one male weightlifter into the Olympic competition. Marcos Rojas accepted a spare berth unused by the Tripartite Commission as the next highest-ranked weightlifter vying for qualification in the men's 61 kg category based on the IWF Absolute World Rankings.

Athlete	Event	Snatch		Clean & Jerk		Total	Rank
Athlete	Event	Result	Rank	Result	Rank	Total	Rank
Marcos Rojas	Men's –61 kg	105	14	135	12	240	12

== Wrestling ==
Peru qualified one wrestler for the men's freestyle 86 kg division in the Olympic competition by progressing to the top two finals at the 2020 Pan American Qualification Tournament in Ottawa, Canada.

Key:

- VT (ranking points: 5–0 or 0–5) – Victory by fall.
- VB (ranking points: 5–0 or 0–5) – Victory by injury (VF for forfeit, VA for withdrawal or disqualification)
- PP (ranking points: 3–1 or 1–3) – Decision by points – the loser with technical points.
- PO (ranking points: 3–0 or 0–3) – Decision by points – the loser without technical points.
- ST (ranking points: 4–0 or 0–4) – Great superiority – the loser without technical points and a margin of victory of at least 8 (Greco-Roman) or 10 (freestyle) points.
- SP (ranking points: 4–1 or 1–4) – Technical superiority – the loser with technical points and a margin of victory of at least 8 (Greco-Roman) or 10 (freestyle) points.

Freestyle

Athlete	Event	Round of 16	Quarterfinal	Semifinal	Repechage	Final / BM	
Athlete	Event	Opposition Result	Opposition Result	Opposition Result	Opposition Result	Opposition Result	Rank
Pool Ambrocio	Men's −86 kg	Lin Zs (CHN); L 0–4 ^{ST}	Did not advance				15

== See also ==
- Peru at the 2019 Pan American Games
- Peru at the 2020 Summer Paralympics
