= Brazil at the 2020 Summer Olympics =

- IOC code: BRA
- NOC: Brazilian Olympic Committee
- Website: www.cob.org.br (in Portuguese)

in Tokyo, Japan July 23, 2021 – August 8, 2021
- Competitors: 301 (160 men & 142 women) in 28 sports
- Flag bearers (opening): Ketleyn Quadros; Bruno Rezende
- Flag bearer (closing): Rebeca Andrade
- Medals Ranked 12th: Gold 7 Silver 6 Bronze 8 Total 21

Summer Olympics appearances (overview)
- 1920; 1924; 1928; 1932; 1936; 1948; 1952; 1956; 1960; 1964; 1968; 1972; 1976; 1980; 1984; 1988; 1992; 1996; 2000; 2004; 2008; 2012; 2016; 2020; 2024; 2028

Brazil, the previous host of the 2016 Olympics at Rio de Janeiro, competed at the 2020 Summer Olympics in Tokyo. Originally scheduled to take place from 24 July to 9 August 2020, the Games were postponed to 23 July to 8 August 2021, because of the COVID-19 pandemic. It was the nation's twenty-third appearance at the Summer Olympics, having competed in all editions of the modern era from 1920 onwards, except the 1928 Summer Olympics in Amsterdam.

Tied with 2016 Games in number of gold medals (7) and silver medals (6) but with 2 more bronze medals (8), this was the nation's most successful overall performance at the Olympics, therefore becoming the second nation to surpass its medal total at the Olympics immediately following one that it hosted (the other one was Great Britain in the 2016 Olympics). The country broke the record for medals in one edition (21) and was also in the highest position on medal table on games history (twelfth place). It was also the edition of the Games where Brazil won medals in more different disciplines.

In this edition, Brazil won its first medals ever in three sports: tennis (with the bronze medal obtained by the double Laura Pigossi and Luisa Stefani) and the debutants skateboarding (the 3 silver medals won by Kelvin Hoefler, Rayssa Leal and Pedro Barros) and surfing (the gold medal achieved by Ítalo Ferreira). Brazil also won its first gold medal ever in canoeing, won by Isaquias Queiroz.

== Summary ==
The first Brazilian medal in Tokyo was awarded to skateboarder Kelvin Hoefler in men's street with a score of 36.15 in the first Olympic competition in the sport's history. Japanese skateboarder star Yuto Horigome claimed the first Olympic gold medal with a score of 37.18 and American Jagger Eaton scored a 35.35, winning the bronze medal.

The second medal in skateboarding, was conquered by the 13-year-old Rayssa Leal in the Olympics's inaugural women's skateboarding competition: the women's street, one day after the men's street. The board flips, slides and grinds of Brazil's youngest-ever medalist drew as much acclaim as she won the silver medal with a score of 14.64, below the gold medalist Japanese Momiji Nishiya with 15,26. Leal was the youngest athlete to win an Olympic medal since the 1936 Olympic Games and to date among the 10 youngest Olympic medalists ever.

The third medal in skateboarding was achieved in the inaugural Olympic men's park by Pedro Barros. With a score of 86,14, he won the silver medal, below Australian Keegan Palmer, with a score of 95.83.

In the judo competition, two bronze medals were achieved. In the men's 66 kg competition, Daniel Cargnin lost the semifinal to Japanese gold medalist Hifumi Abe and defeated Israeli Baruch Shmailov in the bronze medal dispute. Twice world champion Mayra Aguiar won one of the bronze medals in the women's 78 kg category, after defeating in bronze medal dispute South Korean Yoon Hyun-ji; she made history conquering three consecutive bronze medals in London 2012, Rio 2016 and Tokyo 2020. She is the first Brazilian woman to win three Olympic medals in an individual sport.

The first gold medal won by Brazil in Tokyo was in surfing, in the debut of the sport at the Olympic Games.Ítalo Ferreira earned the first-ever gold after running away from Japanese Kanoa Igarashi in an electric final. The 2019 ISA World Surfing Games Champion recovered from snapping his board early-on and posted wave high scores of 7.77 and a 7.37 for a combined 15.14, while Kanoa Igarashi counted a 3.83 and a 2.77, combining for a 6.60.

In the swimming competitions, three medals were earned, two bronze and one gold medal. Fernando Scheffer won the bronze medal in men's 200 m freestyle, with a time of 1m44s66, behind Britishers silver medalist Duncan Scott (1m44s26) and gold medalist Tom Dean (1m44s22). Bruno Fratus won the bronze medal in men's 50 m freestyle, with a time of 21s57, behind silver medalist Florent Manaudou and gold medalist Caeleb Dressel. Though Fratus had a decorated career at the World Championships, Pan Pacific, and Pan American Games, he finally won an Olympic medal. Fratus became with 32-years-old also the oldest pool swimmer in history to win their first Olympic medal.

The marathon-swimmer Ana Marcela Cunha was the gold medalist in Women's 10 km open water, won with a time of 1:59:30.8, becoming the first Brazilian woman swimmer to win a gold medal in the Olympics. Former Olympic gold medalist Sharon van Rouwendaal of the Netherlands finished second, with Kareena Lee of Australia taking the bronze. Cunha has obtained, until 2019, 11 medals in World Swimming Championships, 5 being gold, but this was the first Olympic medal in her career.

In artistic gymnastics, Rebeca Andrade won two medals. In the qualification round, Andrade had one of the best performances of her career, qualifying in third to the vault final, fourth to floor exercise final, and second to the all-around final. After leading the competition in the first two rotations of the women's all-around final, Andrade won silver medal with a final score of 57.298 after stepping out of bounds on two of her floor passes. American Sunisa Lee won gold with a score of 57.433. This marked the first-ever Olympic medal win for a female Brazilian artistic gymnast and the first Olympic all-around medalist who qualified as an individual.

In the final of women's vault, Andrade set another record for her country, surpassing her third-place vault final qualification to win the event with an average score of 15.083. This made her the first Olympic champion in Brazilian women's artistic gymnastics history and also the first Brazil woman to win more than one medal in a single edition of the Olympic Games. Andrade also served as a flag bearer for Brazil at the Games' closing ceremony.

In the women's doubles tennis tournament, Laura Pigossi and Luisa Stefani earned the bronze medal. They defeated Russians Veronika Kudermetova and defending gold medallist Elena Vesnina in the bronze medal match by 2 sets to 1, saving four straight match points before overcoming in the final set. The medal was one of the most unexpected: the Brazilians got an Olympic spot just one week before the 2020 Games opening, with Luísa Stefani ranked No. 23 in the doubles ranking and Pigossi only at No. 190. Although the Brazilian pair played together for the first time, during the campaign they managed to save eight match-points. In addition to the four in the bronze medal match, they saved another four in the match against Czech duo Karolína Plíšková and Markéta Vondroušová in the round of 16. Pigossi and Stefani became the first Brazilians to obtain an Olympic medal in tennis in history.

Two bronze medals were conquered in athletics. After an Olympic cycle much lower than expected, without medals in World Championships and even in Pan American Games between 2016 and 2020, Olympic record holder and gold medalist in Rio 2016, Thiago Braz participates in men's pole vault in Tokyo/2020 again without being the favorite; in the final he jumped 5.87 m and secured bronze medal, behind the world record holder Swede Armand Duplantis who got gold medal with 6.02 m and the American Chris Nilsen, with 5.97 m got the silver medal. Braz finished with his second consecutive Olympic medal, a very rare feat in Brazilian athletics.

Alison dos Santos got the bronze medal in men's 400 metres hurdles, in what has been described as one of the greatest races in Olympic history; Karsten Warholm of Norway won, setting a new world record of 45.94 seconds. He beat his own previous record, set a month before, by 0.76 seconds; silver medalist Rai Benjamin of the United States beat the previous record by 0.53 seconds. The event was the strongest in 400m hurdles history, with the three Olympic medalists getting the three best times in the history of the event, all beating Kevin Young's old world record (which had lasted almost 30 years and had only fallen a month before the Olympics). Alison became the 3rd best in the history of the race, with a time of 46.72 seconds.

Martine Grael and Kahena Kunze sailed to gold after winning the women's 49erFX competition. They came in third in the medal race scoring 6 points which bring them a total of 76 points to win the top podium. Germany's Tina Lutz and Susann Beucke clinched silver with a total score of 83 and double world champions Annemiek Bekkering and Annette Duetz from the Netherlands picked up bronze after amassing 88 points. This was the Brazilian duo's second gold medal in the same event after winning in Rio/2016. Martine Grael continued the tradition of her family in sailing: her father Torben Grael is five-time Olympic medalist (twice gold) and her uncle Lars Grael is a twice bronze medalist.

In the canoeing, the reigning world champion Isaquias Queiroz and silver medallist in Rio 2016, finished with a time of four minutes, 04.408 seconds, ahead of China's Liu Hao and Moldova's Serghei Tarnovschi for his maiden Olympic title. He became the first Brazilian to win an Olympic gold medal in canoeing and it was also the fourth Olympic medal in his career. Isaquias had been through adversity in his younger years. As a toddler he poured boiling water on himself and spent a month in hospital recovering, at the age of 5 he was kidnapped and offered up for adoption before being rescued by his mother, and 5 years later he fell out of a tree while trying to catch a snake and lost a kidney.

In the boxing competitions, Brazilians earned three Olympic medals. Abner Teixeira lost the semifinal to Cuban Julio César La Cruz in men's heavyweight and was awarded a bronze medal. Reigning world champion Beatriz Ferreira was the silver medalist in women's lightweight in Boxing. She lost the final to Kellie Harrington from Ireland in a unanimous decision. This is the best result achieved by a Brazilian woman in Boxing at Olympic Games.

Hebert Conceição won the gold medal in the men's middleweight event at the 2020 Summer Olympics in one of the most shocking fights in Tokyo, by knocking out Ukrainian Oleksandr Khyzhniak in the third round. Khyzhniak had spent the fight's first 7 1/2 minutes smacking Conceição around the ring with his vicious combination of power and accuracy and won the first two rounds unanimously. In the third and final round, the Brazilian caught Khyzhniak with a counter left hook during an exchange, and Khyzhniak went to the canvas hard. The referee declared Conceição winner by knock out. He joins lightweight Robson Conceição as the only boxing gold medalists in Brazil's Olympic history.

The seventh gold medal earned by Brazil in Tokyo was awarded in men's football tournament. The incumbent gold medalists in Rio 2016 finished at the top of their group with 7 points, following a 4–2 win over Germany, a 0–0 draw to Ivory Coast and a 3–1 win over Saudi Arabia. They beat Egypt 1–0 in the quarter-finals, and Mexico in the semi-finals with a 4–1 victory in the penalty shootouts following a 0–0 draw in extra time. In the final against Spain, Matheus Cunha opened the score for Brazil in the first half and a Mikel Oyarzabal goal in the second half forced the match into extra time; Malcom scored the winning goal in the 108th minute, which lead Brazil to their second Olympic gold medal and seventh medal in men's football at Olympic Games. Brazil became the fifth country to win back-to-back Olympic golds, after Great Britain (1908, 1912), Uruguay(1924, 1928), Hungary (1964, 1968) and Argentina (2004, 2008). Among the players, Daniel Alves was Brazil's 38-year-old captain, who had led the team as an over-age player and became the most decorated football player with his personal trophy haul to 43 titles.

In the volleyball competitions, the last Brazilian medal of 2020 Summer Olympics was a silver one achieved by the women's national team. The team went undefeated in the pool round and in the bracket leading up to the final after winning seven matches, but lost easily by 3 sets to 0 (25–21, 25–20, 25–14) to United States, who won its first gold medal in women's volleyball. Nonetheless, the silver medal in women's volleyball, Brazil had the poorest campaign in the sport since the 1992 Summer Olympics, with a fourth place in men's tournament and missing a medal in beach volleyball for the first time since the inaugural tournament in 1996 Summer Olympics.

== Medalists ==
Medal	Name	Sport	Event	Date
Gold	Ítalo Ferreira	Surfing	Men's shortboard	27 July
Gold	Rebeca Andrade	Gymnastics	Women's vault	1 August
Gold	Martine Grael; Kahena Kunze	Sailing	Women's 49erFX	3 August
Gold	Ana Marcela Cunha	Swimming	Women's marathon 10 km	4 August
Gold	Isaquias Queiroz	Canoeing	Men's C-1 1000 metres	7 August
Gold	Hebert Conceição	Boxing	Men's middleweight	7 August
Gold	Brazil national under-23 football team: Santos; Dani Alves; Nino; Diego Carlos; Guilherme Arana; Douglas Luiz; Bruno Guimarães; Claudinho; Antony; Matheus Cunha; Richarlison; Brenno; Bruno Fuchs; Ricardo Graça; Abner; Gabriel Menino; Matheus Henrique; Reinier Jesus; Malcom; Paulinho; Gabriel Martinelli; Lucão	Football	Men's tournament	7 August
Silver	Kelvin Hoefler	Skateboarding	Men's street	25 July
Silver	Rayssa Leal	Skateboarding	Women's street	26 July
Silver	Rebeca Andrade	Gymnastics	Women's all-around	29 July
Silver	Pedro Barros	Skateboarding	Men's park	5 August
Silver	Beatriz Ferreira	Boxing	Women's lightweight	8 August
Silver	Brazil women's national volleyball team: Carol Gattaz; Rosamaria Montibeller; Macris Carneiro; Roberta Ratzke; Gabriela Guimarães; Natália Pereira; Ana Carolina da Silva; Fernanda Garay; Ana Cristina de Souza; Camila Brait; Ana Beatriz Corrêa; Tandara Caixeta	Volleyball	Women's tournament	8 August
Bronze	Daniel Cargnin	Judo	Men's 66 kg	25 July
Bronze	Fernando Scheffer	Swimming	Men's 200 m freestyle	27 July
Bronze	Mayra Aguiar	Judo	Women's 78 kg	29 July
Bronze	Laura Pigossi; Luisa Stefani	Tennis	Women's doubles	31 July
Bronze	Bruno Fratus	Swimming	Men's 50 m freestyle	1 August
Bronze	Alison dos Santos	Athletics	Men's 400 metres hurdles	3 August
Bronze	Abner Teixeira	Boxing	Men's heavyweight	3 August
Bronze	Thiago Braz	Athletics	Men's pole vault	3 August

Medals by sport
Sport	1st place, gold medalist(s)	2nd place, silver medalist(s)	3rd place, bronze medalist(s)	Total
Boxing	1	1	1	3
Gymnastics	1	1	0	2
Swimming	1	0	2	3
Canoeing	1	0	0	1
Football	1	0	0	1
Sailing	1	0	0	1
Surfing	1	0	0	1
Skateboarding	0	3	0	3
Volleyball	0	1	0	1
Athletics	0	0	2	2
Judo	0	0	2	2
Tennis	0	0	1	1
Total	7	6	8	21

Medals by gender
Gender	1st place, gold medalist(s)	2nd place, silver medalist(s)	3rd place, bronze medalist(s)	Total
Men	4	2	6	12
Women	3	4	2	9
Mixed	0	0	0	0
Total	7	6	8	21

Medals by day
Day	1st place, gold medalist(s)	2nd place, silver medalist(s)	3rd place, bronze medalist(s)	Total
24 July	0	0	0	0
25 July	0	1	1	2
26 July	0	1	0	1
27 July	1	0	1	2
28 July	0	0	0	0
29 July	0	1	1	2
30 July	0	0	0	0
31 July	0	0	1	1
1 August	1	0	1	2
2 August	0	0	0	0
3 August	1	0	3	4
4 August	1	0	0	1
5 August	0	1	0	1
6 August	0	0	0	0
7 August	3	0	0	3
8 August	0	2	0	2
Total	7	6	8	21

=== Multiple medallist ===
The following competitor won multiple medals at the 2020 Olympic Games.

Name	Medal	Sport	Event
Rebeca Andrade	Gold; Silver	Gymnastics	Women's vault Women's all-around

== Competitors ==
The following is the list of number of competitors in the Games. Note that reserves in athletics, equestrian, football, handball, rugby sevens, and table tennis are not counted:

Sport	Men	Women	Total
Archery	1	1	2
Athletics	33	20	53
Badminton	1	1	2
Boxing	4	3	7
Canoeing	4	1	5
Cycling	3	2	5
Diving	2	2	4
Equestrian	7	0	7
Fencing	1	1	2
Football	18	18	36
Gymnastics	5	7	12
Handball	14	14	28
Judo	7	6	13
Modern pentathlon	0	1	1
Rowing	1	0	1
Rugby sevens	0	12	12
Sailing	7	6	13
Shooting	1	0	1
Skateboarding	6	6	12
Surfing	2	2	4
Swimming	16	11	27
Table tennis	3	3	6
Taekwondo	2	1	3
Tennis	4	2	6
Triathlon	1	2	3
Volleyball	16	16	32
Weightlifting	0	2	2
Wrestling	1	2	3
Total	160	142	302

== Archery ==
One Brazilian archer secured a quota place in the men's individual recurve by winning the silver medal and receiving a spare berth unused in the mixed team at the 2019 Pan American Games in Lima, Peru. Another Brazilian archer scored a gold-medal triumph to book one of three available spots in the women's individual recurve at the 2021 Pan American Qualification Tournament in Monterrey, Mexico.

Athlete	Event	Ranking round		Round of 64	Round of 32	Round of 16	Quarterfinals	Semifinals	Final / BM	
Athlete	Event	Score	Seed	Opposition Score	Opposition Score	Opposition Score	Opposition Score	Opposition Score	Opposition Score	Rank
Marcus D'Almeida	Men's individual	651	40	Huston (GBR); W 7–1	van den Berg (NED); W 7–1	Nespoli (ITA); L 0–6	Did not advance			
Ane Marcelle dos Santos	Women's individual	636	33	Vázquez (MEX); W 6–4	An S (KOR); L 1–7	Did not advance				
Marcus D'Almeida; Ane Marcelle dos Santos	Mixed team	1287	20	—N/a		Did not advance				

== Athletics ==
Brazilian athletes further achieved the entry standards, either by qualifying time or by world ranking, in the following track and field events (up to a maximum of 3 athletes in each event): The team was selected by the Brazilian Athletics Confederation on 1 July 2021.

Key

- Note–Ranks given for track events are within the athlete's heat only
- Q = Qualified for the next round
- NR = National record
- N/A = Round not applicable for the event
- Bye = Athlete not required to compete in round

Track & road events
Men

Athlete	Event	Heat		Quarterfinal		Semifinal		Final	
Athlete	Event	Result	Rank	Result	Rank	Result	Rank	Result	Rank
Paulo André de Oliveira	100 m	Bye		10.17	3 Q	10.31	8	Did not advance	
Rodrigo do Nascimento	100 m	Bye		10.24	6	Did not advance			
Felipe Bardi dos Santos	100 m	Bye		10.26	5	Did not advance			
Aldemir da Silva Junior	200 m	20.84	6	—N/a		Did not advance			
Jorge Vides	200 m	20.94	4	—N/a		Did not advance			
Lucas Vilar	200 m	21.31	6	—N/a		Did not advance			
Lucas Carvalho	400 m	46.12	7	—N/a		Did not advance			
Thiago André	800 m	1:47.75	8	—N/a		Did not advance			
Thiago André	1500 m	3:47.71	13	—N/a		Did not advance			
Gabriel Constantino	110 m hurdles	13.55	5 Q	—N/a		13.89	8	Did not advance	
Eduardo de Deus	110 m hurdles	13.78	8	—N/a		did not advance			
Rafael Henrique Pereira	110 m hurdles	13.46	3 Q	—N/a		13.62	6	Did not advance	
Alison dos Santos	400 m hurdles	48.42	2 Q	—N/a		47.31 SA	1 Q	46.72 SA	3rd place, bronze medalist(s)
Márcio Teles	400 m hurdles	49.70	6	—N/a		Did not advance			
Altobeli da Silva	3000 m steeplechase	8:29.17	9	—N/a				Did not advance	
Felipe Bardi dos Santos; Rodrigo do Nascimento; Paulo André de Oliveira; Derick Silva; Jorge Vides	4 × 100 m relay	38.34	4	—N/a				Did not advance	
Daniel Chaves da Silva	Marathon	—N/a						DNF	
Daniel Ferreira do Nascimento	Marathon	—N/a						DNF	
Paulo Roberto Paula	Marathon	—N/a						2:26:08	69
Caio Bonfim	20 km walk	—N/a						1:23:21	13
Matheus Corrêa	20 km walk	—N/a						1:31:47	46
Lucas Mazzo	20 km walk	—N/a						DNF	

Women

Athlete	Event	Heat		Quarterfinal		Semifinal		Final	
Athlete	Event	Result	Rank	Result	Rank	Result	Rank	Result	Rank
Vitória Cristina Rosa	100 m	Bye		DNS	Did not advance				
Rosângela Santos	100 m	Bye		11.33	5	Did not advance			
Ana Carolina Azevedo	200 m	23.20	5	—N/a		Did not advance			
Vitória Cristina Rosa	200 m	23.59	7	—N/a		—N/a		did not advance	
Tiffani Marinho	400 m	52.11	5	—N/a		Did not advance			
Ketiley Batista	100 m hurdles	13.40	7	—N/a		Did not advance			
Chayenne da Silva	400 m hurdles	57.55	8	—N/a		Did not advance			
Tatiane Raquel da Silva	3000 m steeplechase	9:36.43 NR	7	—N/a				Did not advance	
Simone Ferraz	3000 m steeplechase	10:00.92	14	—N/a				Did not advance	
Ana Carolina Azevedo; Bruna Farias; Ana Cláudia Lemos; Lorraine Martins*; Vitória Cristina Rosa; Rosângela Santos	4 × 100 m relay	43.15	5	—N/a				Did not advance	
Érica de Sena	20 km walk	—N/a						1:31:39	11

Mixed

Athlete	Event	Heat		Final	
Athlete	Event	Result	Rank	Result	Rank
Pedro Burmann; João Henrique Cabral*; Anderson Henriques; Tábata de Carvalho; Geisa Coutinho*; Tiffani Marinho	4 × 400 m relay	3:15.89	7	Did not advance	

Field events
Men

Athlete	Event	Qualification		Final	
Athlete	Event	Distance	Position	Distance	Position
Samory Fraga	Long jump	7.88	16	Did not advance	
Alexsandro Melo	Long jump	6.95	29	Did not advance	
Alexsandro Melo	Triple jump	15.65	26	Did not advance	
Mateus de Sá	Triple jump	16.49	20	Did not advance	
Almir Cunha dos Santos	Triple jump	16.27	23	Did not advance	
Fernando Ferreira	High jump	2.21	21	Did not advance	
Thiago Moura	High jump	2.21	21	Did not advance	
Thiago Braz	Pole vault	5.75	8 Q	5.87	3rd place, bronze medalist(s)
Augusto Dutra de Oliveira	Pole vault	5.65	16	Did not advance	
Darlan Romani	Shot put	21.31	4 Q	21.88	4

Women

Athlete	Event	Qualification		Final	
Athlete	Event	Distance	Position	Distance	Position
Eliane Martins	Long jump	6.43	18	Did not advance	
Núbia Soares	Triple jump	14.07	17	Did not advance	
Geisa Arcanjo	Shot put	16.46	29	Did not advance	
Izabela da Silva	Discus throw	61.52	12 Q	60.39	11
Andressa de Morais	Discus throw	58.90	20	Did not advance	
Fernanda Martins	Discus throw	57.90	24	Did not advance	
Laila Ferrer e Silva	Javelin throw	59.47	18	Did not advance	
Jucilene de Lima	Javelin throw	60.14	15	Did not advance	

Combined events – Men's decathlon

Athlete	Event	100 m	LJ	SP	HJ	400 m	110H	DT	PV	JT	1500 m	Final	Rank
Felipe dos Santos	Result	10.58	7.38	14.13	2.02	49.31	14.58	39.91	4.60	54.56	4:52.40	7880	18
Felipe dos Santos	Points	956	905	736	822	847	901	663	790	656	604	7880	18

== Badminton ==
Brazil entered two badminton players (one per gender) into the Olympic tournament. Rio 2016 Olympian Ygor Coelho de Oliveira and debutant Fabiana Silva were selected to compete in the men's and women's singles based on the BWF World Race to Tokyo Rankings.

Athlete	Event	Group Stage			Elimination	Quarterfinal	Semifinal	Final / BM	
Athlete	Event	Opposition Score	Opposition Score	Rank	Opposition Score	Opposition Score	Opposition Score	Opposition Score	Rank
Ygor Coelho	Men's singles	Paul (MRI); W (21–5, 21–16)	Tsuneyama (JPN); L (14–21, 8–21)	2	Did not advance				
Fabiana Silva	Women's singles	Ulitina (UKR); L (14–21, 20–22)	Zhang (USA); L (9–21, 10–21)	3	Did not advance				

== Boxing ==
Brazil entered seven boxers (four male and three female) to compete in each of the following weight classes into the Olympic tournament. With the cancellation of the 2021 Pan American Qualification Tournament in Buenos Aires, Wanderson de Oliveira (men's flyweight), Hebert Conceição (men's middleweight), Keno Machado (men's light heavyweight), Abner Teixeira (men's heavyweight), Graziele de Sousa (women's flyweight), Jucielen Romeu (women's featherweight), and reigning Pan American Games gold medalist Beatriz Ferreira (women's lightweight) finished among the top five of their respective weight divisions to secure their places in the Brazilian squad based on the IOC's Boxing Task Force Rankings for the Americas.

Men

Athlete	Event	Round of 32	Round of 16	Quarterfinals	Semifinals	Final	
Athlete	Event	Opposition Result	Opposition Result	Opposition Result	Opposition Result	Opposition Result	Rank
Wanderson de Oliveira	Lightweight	Salamana (EOR); W 5–0	Asanau (BLR); W 3–2	Cruz (CUB); L 1–4	Did not advance		5
Hebert Conceição	Middleweight	Bye	Tuohetaerbieke (CHN); W 3–2	Amankul (KAZ); W 3–2	Bakshi (ROC); W 4–1	Khyzhniak (UKR); W KO	1st place, gold medalist(s)
Keno Machado	Light heavyweight	Bye	Chen Dx (CHN); W 5–0	Whittaker (GBR); L 2–3	Did not advance		5
Abner Teixeira	Heavyweight	Bye	Clarke (GBR); W 4–1	Ishaish (JOR); W 4–1	La Cruz (CUB); L 1–4	Did not advance	3rd place, bronze medalist(s)

Women

Athlete	Event	Round of 32	Round of 16	Quarterfinals	Semifinals	Final	
Athlete	Event	Opposition Result	Opposition Result	Opposition Result	Opposition Result	Opposition Result	Rank
Graziele Jesus	Flyweight	Bye	Namiki (JPN); L 0–5	Did not advance			9
Jucielen Romeu	Featherweight	Bye	Artingstall (GBR); L 0–5	Did not advance			9
Beatriz Ferreira	Lightweight	Bye	Wu S-y (TPE); W 5–0	Kodirova (UZB); W 5–0	Potkonen (FIN); W 5–0	Harrington (IRL); L 0–5	2nd place, silver medalist(s)

== Canoeing ==
=== Slalom ===
Brazilian canoeists qualified one boat for each of the following classes through the 2019 ICF Canoe Slalom World Championships in La Seu d'Urgell, Spain.

Athlete	Event	Preliminary						Semifinal		Final	
Athlete	Event	Run 1	Rank	Run 2	Rank	Best	Rank	Time	Rank	Time	Rank
Pepe Gonçalves	Men's K-1	98.13	4	92.91	2	92.91	10 Q	104.33	19	Did not advance	
Ana Sátila	Women's C-1	120.56	4	109.90	2	109.90	4 Q	114.27	3 Q	164.71	10
Ana Sátila	Women's K-1	108.22	5	106.82	7	106.82	7 Q	114.62	13	Did not advance	

=== Sprint ===
Brazilian canoeists qualified two boats in each of the following distances for the Games through the 2019 ICF Canoe Sprint World Championships in Szeged, Hungary. With the cancellation of the 2021 Pan American Championships, Brazil accepted the invitation from the International Canoe Federation to send a canoeist in the men's K-1 1000 m to the Games.

Athlete	Event	Heats		Quarterfinals		Semifinals		Final	
Athlete	Event	Time	Rank	Time	Rank	Time	Rank	Time	Rank
Vagner Souta	Men's K-1 1000 m	3:57.178	5 QF	3:52.402	3	Did not advance			
Jacky Godmann	Men's C-1 1000 m	4:24.732	4 QF	4:18.208	6	Did not advance			
Isaquias Queiroz	Men's C-1 1000 m	3:59.894	1 SF	Bye		4:05.579	1 FA	4:04.408	1st place, gold medalist(s)
Jacky Godmann; Isaquias Queiroz	Men's C-2 1000 m	3:48.378	3 QF	3:48.611	1 SF	3:27.167	4 FA	3:27.603	4

Qualification Legend: FA = Qualify to final (medal); FB = Qualify to final B (non-medal)

== Cycling ==
=== Mountain biking ===
Brazilian mountain bikers qualified for two men's and one women's quota place each into the Olympic cross-country race, as a result of the nation's fifth-place finish for men and eighteenth for women, respectively, in the UCI Olympic Ranking List of 16 May 2021. The mountain biking team was named on May 31, 2021, with Jaqueline Mourão leading the riders to her third Summer Olympics.

Athlete	Event	Time	Rank
Henrique Avancini	Men's cross-country	1:28:09	13
Luiz Cocuzzi	Men's cross-country	1:32:21	27
Jaqueline Mourão	Women's cross-country	–2 LAP	35

=== BMX ===
Brazil received one men's and one women's quota spot each for BMX at the Olympics, as a result of the nation's ninth-place finish for men and seventh for women in the UCI Olympic Ranking List of June 1, 2021. Two-time Olympian Renato Rezende and her Rio 2016 teammate Priscilla Carnaval were officially named on June 10, 2021.

Athlete	Event	Quarterfinal		Semifinal		Final	
Athlete	Event	Points	Rank	Points	Rank	Result	Rank
Renato Rezende	Men's race	10	3 Q	20	7	Did not advance	
Priscilla Carnaval	Women's race	18	6	Did not advance			

== Diving ==
Brazil sent four divers (two per gender) into the Olympic competition by reaching the semifinals of the men's and women's 10 m platform and women's 3 m springboard at the 2020 FINA Diving World Cup.

Athlete	Event	Preliminary		Semifinal		Final	
Athlete	Event	Points	Rank	Points	Rank	Points	Rank
Kawan Pereira	Men's 10 m platform	371.65	17	410.30	12 Q	393.85	10
Isaac Souza	Men's 10 m platform	339.30	20	Did not advance			
Luana Lira	Women's 3 m springboard	244.35	21	Did not advance			
Ingrid Oliveira	Women's 10 m platform	261.20	24	Did not advance			

== Equestrian ==
Brazilian equestrians qualified a full squad each in team eventing and jumping competitions by virtue of a top-three finish at the 2019 Pan American Games in Lima, Peru.

Unable to fulfill the NOC Certificate of Capability at the end of the 2019 season, Brazil received a spot for an equestrian competing in the individual dressage by finishing in the top four, outside the group selection, of the individual FEI Olympic Rankings for Group E (Central and South America).

=== Dressage ===
Athlete	Horse	Event	Grand Prix		Grand Prix Freestyle		Overall	
Athlete	Horse	Event	Score	Rank	Technical	Artistic	Score	Rank
João Victor Oliva	Escorial	Individual	70.419	26	Did not advance			

Qualification Legend: Q = Qualified for the final; q = Qualified for the final as a lucky loser

=== Eventing ===
Athlete	Horse	Event	Dressage		Cross-country			Jumping						Total	
Athlete	Horse	Event	Dressage		Cross-country			Qualifier			Final			Total	
Athlete	Horse	Event	Penalties	Rank	Penalties	Total	Rank	Penalties	Total	Rank	Penalties	Total	Rank	Penalties	Rank
Rafael Losano	Fuiloda	Individual	36.00	43	Retired			Did not advance							
Carlos Paro	Goliath	Individual	36.10	44	22.80	58.90	33	4.00	62.90	32	Did not advance			62.90	32
Marcelo Tosi	Glenfly	Individual	31.50	21	8.80	40.30	24	Withdrew			Did not advance				
Rafael Losano; Carlos Paro; Marcelo Tosi; Márcio Appel (s)	Fuiloda; Goliath; Glenfly; Iberon Jmen	Team	103.60	11	231.60	335.20	13	108.40+20.00	463.60	12	—N/a			463.60	12

- (s) – substituted before jumping – 20 replacement penalties

=== Jumping ===
Athlete	Horse	Event	Qualification		Final		
Athlete	Horse	Event	Penalties	Rank	Penalties	Time	Rank
Yuri Mansur	Alfons	Individual	0.00	=1 Q	8.00	87.27	20
Marlon Zanotelli	Edgar	Individual	4.00	=31	Did not advance		
Yuri Mansur; Rodrigo Pessoa; Pedro Veniss; Marlon Zanotelli	Alfons; Carlito's Way; Quabri de l'Isle; Edgar	Team	25.00	8 Q	29.00	244.01	6

Pedro Veniss and Quabri de l'Isle have been named the traveling alternates.

== Fencing ==
Brazil entered two fencers into the Olympic competition. Rio 2016 Olympians Guilherme Toldo (men's foil) and 2019 world champion Nathalie Moellhausen (women's épée) claimed spots in their respective individual events as the highest-ranked fencers vying for qualification from the Americas in the FIE Adjusted Official Rankings.

Athlete	Event	Round of 64	Round of 32	Round of 16	Quarterfinal	Semifinal	Final / BM	
Athlete	Event	Opposition Score	Opposition Score	Opposition Score	Opposition Score	Opposition Score	Opposition Score	Rank
Guilherme Toldo	Men's foil	Bye	Saito (JPN); L 10–15	Did not advance				
Nathalie Moellhausen	Women's épée	Bye	Fiamingo (ITA); L 9–10	Did not advance				

== Football ==
Summary

Key:

- A.E.T – After extra time.
- P – Match decided by penalty-shootout.

Team	Event	Group Stage				Quarterfinal	Semifinal	Final / BM	
Team	Event	Opposition Score	Opposition Score	Opposition Score	Rank	Opposition Score	Opposition Score	Opposition Score	Rank
Brazil men's	Men's tournament	Germany; W 4–2	Ivory Coast; D 0–0	Saudi Arabia; W 3–1	1	Egypt; W 1–0	Mexico; W 4–1^{P} 0–0 (a.e.t.)	Spain; W 2–1 (a.e.t.)	1st place, gold medalist(s)
Brazil women's	Women's tournament	China; W 5–0	Netherlands; D 3–3	Zambia; W 1–0	2	Canada; L 3–4^{P} 0–0 (a.e.t.)	did not advance		

=== Men's tournament ===
Brazil men's football team qualified for the Olympics by securing an outright berth as the runners-up in the final stage of the 2020 CONMEBOL Pre-Olympic Tournament in Colombia.

Team roster

Brazil's 50-man preliminary squad was announced on 15 June 2021. The 18-man squad was announced on 17 June. However, after several clubs refused to release their players, a new squad was announced on 2 July 2021, along with four additional players to complete the final roster of 22. On 8 July, Ricardo Graça replaced Gabriel Magalhães who withdrew injured. On 14 July, Malcom replaced Douglas Augusto who withdrew injured.

Head coach: André Jardine

No.	Pos.	Player	Date of birth (age)	Caps	Goals	Club
1	GK	Aderbar Santos*	17 March 1990 (aged 31)	1	0	(Brazilian Football Confederation) Athletico Paranaense
2	MF	Gabriel Menino	29 September 2000 (aged 20)	3	0	(Brazilian Football Confederation) Palmeiras
3	DF	Diego Carlos*	15 March 1993 (aged 28)	1	1	(Royal Spanish Football Federation) Sevilla
4	DF	Ricardo Graça	16 February 1997 (aged 24)	3	0	(Brazilian Football Confederation) Vasco da Gama
5	MF	Douglas Luiz	9 May 1998 (aged 23)	8	2	(The Football Association) Aston Villa
6	DF	Guilherme Arana	14 April 1997 (aged 24)	5	1	(Brazilian Football Confederation) Atlético Mineiro
7	FW	Paulinho	15 July 2000 (aged 21)	19	6	(German Football Association) Bayer Leverkusen
8	MF	Bruno Guimarães	16 November 1997 (aged 23)	12	0	(French Football Federation) Lyon
9	FW	Matheus Cunha	27 May 1999 (aged 22)	19	18	(German Football Association) Hertha BSC
10	FW	Richarlison	10 May 1997 (aged 24)	1	3	(The Football Association) Everton
11	FW	Antony	24 February 2000 (aged 21)	17	6	(Royal Dutch Football Association) Ajax
12	GK	Brenno	1 April 1999 (aged 22)	1	0	(Brazilian Football Confederation) Grêmio
13	DF	Dani Alves* (captain)	6 May 1983 (aged 38)	1	0	(Brazilian Football Confederation) São Paulo
14	DF	Bruno Fuchs	1 April 1999 (aged 22)	8	0	(Russian Football Union) CSKA Moscow
15	DF	Nino	10 April 1997 (aged 24)	8	0	(Brazilian Football Confederation) Fluminense
16	DF	Abner	27 May 2000 (aged 21)	2	0	(Brazilian Football Confederation) Athletico Paranaense
17	FW	Malcom	26 February 1997 (aged 24)	4	0	(Russian Football Union) Zenit Saint Petersburg
18	MF	Matheus Henrique	19 December 1997 (aged 23)	17	1	(Brazilian Football Confederation) Grêmio
19	MF	Reinier	19 January 2002 (aged 19)	11	3	(German Football Association) Borussia Dortmund
20	MF	Claudinho	28 January 1997 (aged 24)	3	0	(Brazilian Football Confederation) Red Bull Bragantino
21	FW	Gabriel Martinelli	18 June 2001 (aged 20)	5	1	(The Football Association) Arsenal
22	GK	Lucão	26 February 2001 (aged 20)	1	0	(Brazilian Football Confederation) Vasco da Gama

* Overage player.

Group play

Pos	Team	Pld	W	D	L	GF	GA	GD	Pts	Qualification
1	Brazil	3	2	1	0	7	3	+4	7	Advance to knockout stage
2	Ivory Coast	3	1	2	0	3	2	+1	5	Advance to knockout stage
3	Germany	3	1	1	1	6	7	−1	4	
4	Saudi Arabia	3	0	0	3	4	8	−4	0	

Source: TOCOG and FIFA
Rules for classification: Group stage tiebreakers
22 July 2021
20:30

Brazil	4–2	Germany
Richarlison 7', 22', 30'; Paulinho 90+5'	Report (TOCOG); Report (FIFA)	Amiri 57'; Ache 84'

International Stadium Yokohama, Yokohama
Referee: Iván Barton (El Salvador)

25 July 2021
17:30

Brazil	0–0	Ivory Coast
	Report (TOCOG); Report (FIFA)

International Stadium Yokohama, Yokohama
Referee: Ismail Elfath (United States)

28 July 2021
17:00

Saudi Arabia	1–3	Brazil
Al-Amri 27'	Report (TOCOG); Report (FIFA)	Cunha 14'; Richarlison 76', 90+3'

Saitama Stadium 2002, Saitama
Referee: Bamlak Tessema Weyesa (Ethiopia)

Quarter-finals

31 July 2021
19:00

Brazil	1–0	Egypt
Cunha 37'	Report (TOCOG); Report (FIFA)

Saitama Stadium 2002, Saitama
Referee: Chris Beath (Australia)

Semi-finals

3 August 2021
17:00

Mexico	0–0 (a.e.t.)	Brazil
	Report (TOCOG); Report (FIFA)
Penalties
Aguirre (penalty missed); Vásquez (penalty missed); Rodríguez (penalty scored)	1–4	(penalty scored) Dani Alves; (penalty scored) Martinelli; (penalty scored) Guimarães; (penalty scored) Reinier

Kashima Stadium, Kashima
Referee: Georgi Kabakov (Bulgaria)

Gold medal match

7 August 2021
20:30

Brazil	2–1 (a.e.t.)	Spain
Cunha 45+2'; Malcom 108'	Report (TOCOG); Report (FIFA)	Oyarzabal 61'

International Stadium Yokohama, Yokohama
Attendance: 0 (Note: Played behind closed doors due to the COVID-19 pandemic in Japan)
Referee: Chris Beath (Australia)

=== Women's tournament ===
Brazil women's football team qualified for the Olympics by winning the gold medal and securing a lone outright berth at the 2018 Copa América Femenina in Chile.

Team roster

The final squad of 22 athletes was announced on 18 June 2021. On 2 July 2021, Adriana withdrew from the squad due to injury and was replaced by Angelina.

Head coach: (Sweden) Pia Sundhage

No.	Pos.	Player	Date of birth (age)	Caps	Goals	Club
1	GK	Bárbara	4 July 1988 (aged 33)	93	0	(Brazilian Football Confederation) Kindermann
2	DF	Poliana	6 February 1991 (aged 30)	63	5	(Brazilian Football Confederation) Corinthians
3	DF	Érika	4 February 1988 (aged 33)	99	8	(Brazilian Football Confederation) Corinthians
4	DF	Rafaelle	18 June 1991 (aged 30)	58	8	(Brazilian Football Confederation) Palmeiras
5	MF	Julia	7 October 1997 (aged 23)	5	2	(Brazilian Football Confederation) Palmeiras
6	DF	Tamires	10 October 1987 (age 39)	91	5	(Brazilian Football Confederation) Corinthians
7	FW	Duda	18 July 1995 (aged 26)	3	1	(Brazilian Football Confederation) São Paulo
8	MF	Formiga	3 March 1978 (aged 43)	196	67	(Brazilian Football Confederation) São Paulo
9	FW	Debinha	20 October 1991 (aged 29)	87	33	(United States Soccer Federation) North Carolina Courage
10	FW	Marta (captain)	19 February 1986 (aged 35)	151	107	(United States Soccer Federation) Orlando Pride
11	MF	Angelina	26 January 2000 (age 26)	0	0	(United States Soccer Federation) OL Reign
12	FW	Ludmila	1 December 1994 (aged 26)	28	3	(Royal Spanish Football Federation) Atlético Madrid
13	DF	Bruna	16 October 1985 (aged 35)	62	9	(Brazilian Football Confederation) Internacional
14	DF	Jucinara	3 August 1993 (aged 27)	16	0	(Royal Spanish Football Federation) Levante
15	FW	Geyse	27 March 1998 (aged 23)	33	16	(Royal Spanish Football Federation) Madrid CFF
16	FW	Beatriz	17 December 1993 (aged 27)	78	31	(Brazilian Football Confederation) Palmeiras
17	MF	Andressinha	1 May 1995 (aged 26)	76	10	(Brazilian Football Confederation) Corinthians
18	GK	Letícia Izidoro	13 August 1994 (aged 26)	66	0	(Portuguese Football Federation) Benfica
19	DF	Letícia Santos	2 December 1994 (aged 26)	41	0	(German Football Association) Eintracht Frankfurt
20	FW	Gio	21 June 2003 (aged 18)	2	0	(Royal Spanish Football Federation) Barcelona
21	FW	Andressa	10 November 1992 (aged 28)	89	20	(Italian Football Federation) Roma
22	GK	Aline	15 April 1989 (aged 32)	13	0	(Royal Spanish Football Federation) Granadilla

Group play

Pos	Team	Pld	W	D	L	GF	GA	GD	Pts	Qualification
1	Netherlands	3	2	1	0	21	8	+13	7	Advance to knockout stage
2	Brazil	3	2	1	0	9	3	+6	7	Advance to knockout stage
3	Zambia	3	0	1	2	7	15	−8	1	
4	China	3	0	1	2	6	17	−11	1	

Source: TOCOG and FIFA
Rules for classification: Group stage tiebreakers
21 July 2021
17:00

China	0–5	Brazil
	Report (TOCOG); Report (FIFA)	Marta 9', 74'; Debinha 22'; Andressa 82' (pen.); Beatriz 89'

Miyagi Stadium, Rifu
Attendance: 1,645
Referee: Kateryna Monzul (Ukraine)

24 July 2021
20:00

Netherlands	3–3	Brazil
Miedema 3', 59'; Janssen 79'	Report (TOCOG); Report (FIFA)	Debinha 16'; Marta 65' (pen.); Ludmila 68'

Miyagi Stadium, Rifu
Attendance: 2,621
Referee: Kate Jacewicz (Australia)

27 July 2021
20:30

Brazil	1–0	Zambia
Andressa 19'	Report (TOCOG); Report (FIFA)

Saitama Stadium 2002, Saitama
Attendance: 0
Referee: Yoshimi Yamashita (Japan)

Quarter-finals

30 July 2021
17:00

Canada	0–0 (a.e.t.)	Brazil
	Report (TOCOG); Report (FIFA)
Penalties
Sinclair (penalty missed); Fleming (penalty scored); Lawrence (penalty scored); Leon (penalty scored); Gilles (penalty scored)	4–3	(penalty scored) Marta; (penalty scored) Debinha; (penalty scored) Érika; (penalty missed) Andressa; (penalty missed) Rafaelle

Miyagi Stadium, Rifu
Attendance: 3,403
Referee: Stéphanie Frappart (France)

== Gymnastics ==
=== Artistic ===
At the 2019 World Artistic Gymnastics Championships in Stuttgart, Germany, the men's squad booked one of the remaining nine berths in the team all-around, while Rio 2016 Olympian Flávia Saraiva topped the list of those eligible for qualification to secure a spot in the women's individual all-around and apparatus events. Brazil failed to qualify a women's squad for the first time since 2000. Additionally, Rebeca Andrade and Diogo Soares earned one of the two continental berths available per gender in the all-around competition at the 2021 Pan American Championships in Rio de Janeiro. In total, Brazil selected seven gymnasts (five men and two women) to compete at the Games.

Men
Team

Athlete	Event	Qualification								Final							
Athlete	Event	Apparatus						Total	Rank	Apparatus						Total	Rank
Athlete	Event	F	PH	R	V	PB	HB	Total	Rank	F	PH	R	V	PB	HB	Total	Rank
Francisco Barretto Júnior	Team	13.000	13.200	13.200	~~13.466~~	14.000	13.833	80.699	42	Did not advance							
Arthur Mariano	Team	~~12.800~~	—N/a		13.500	—N/a	14.133	—N/a		Did not advance							
Diogo Soares	Team	14.200	12.800	13.133	14.066	13.900	~~13.233~~	81.332	36 Q	Did not advance							
Caio Souza	Team	13.966	13.400	14.333	14.600 Q	14.533	13.466	84.298	18 Q	Did not advance							
Total	Team	41.166	39.400	40.666	42.166	42.433	41.432	247.263	9	Did not advance							

Individual

Athlete	Event	Qualification								Final							
Athlete	Event	Apparatus						Total	Rank	Apparatus						Total	Rank
Athlete	Event	F	PH	R	V	PB	HB	Total	Rank	F	PH	R	V	PB	HB	Total	Rank
Diogo Soares	All-around	See team results								14.133	12.833	13.233	13.833	13.700	13.466	81.198	20
Caio Souza	All-around	See team results								12.933	12.133	14.500	14.200	14.500	13.266	81.532	17
Caio Souza	Vault	—N/a			14.700	—N/a		14.700	7 Q	—N/a			13.683	—N/a		13.683	8
Arthur Zanetti	Rings	—N/a		14.900	—N/a			14.900	5 Q	—N/a		14.133	—N/a			14.133	8

Women
Individual

Athlete	Event	Qualification						Final					
Athlete	Event	Apparatus				Total	Rank	Apparatus				Total	Rank
Athlete	Event	V	UB	BB	F	Total	Rank	V	UB	BB	F	Total	Rank
Rebeca Andrade	All-around	15.400	14.200	13.733	14.066	57.399	2 Q	15.300	14.666	13.666	13.666	57.298	2nd place, silver medalist(s)
Rebeca Andrade	Vault	15.100	—N/a			15.100	3 Q	15.083	—N/a			15.083	1st place, gold medalist(s)
Rebeca Andrade	Floor	—N/a			14.066	14.066	4 Q	—N/a			14.033	14.033	5
Flávia Saraiva	Balance beam	—N/a		13.966	—N/a	13.966	9 Q	—N/a		13.133	—N/a	13.133	7
Flávia Saraiva	Floor	—N/a			12.066	12.066	69	Did not advance					

=== Rhythmic ===
Brazil fielded a squad of rhythmic gymnasts to compete at the Olympics, by winning the gold medal in the team all-around competition at the 2021 Pan American Championships in Rio de Janeiro.

Athletes	Event	Qualification				Final			
Athletes	Event	5 apps	3+2 apps	Total	Rank	5 apps.	3+2 apps	Total	Rank
Maria Eduarda Arakaki; Beatriz Linhares; Déborah Medrado; Nicole Pircio; Geovanna Santos	Group	35.450	37.800	73.250	12	Did not advance			

== Handball ==
Summary

Key:

- ET: After extra time
- P – Match decided by penalty-shootout.

Team	Event	Group stage						Quarterfinal	Semifinal	Final / BM	
Team	Event	Opposition Score	Opposition Score	Opposition Score	Opposition Score	Opposition Score	Rank	Opposition Score	Opposition Score	Opposition Score	Rank
Brazil men's	Men's tournament	Norway; L 24–27	France; L 29–34	Spain; L 25–32	Argentina; W 25–23	Germany; L 25–29	5	did not advance			
Brazil women's	Women's tournament	(Russia) ROC; D 24–24	Hungary; W 33–27	Spain; L 23–27	Sweden; L 31–34	France; L 22–29	6	did not advance			

=== Men's tournament ===
Brazil men's national handball team qualified for the Olympics by securing a top-two finish at the Podgorica leg of the 2020 IHF Olympic Qualification Tournament.

Team roster

The squad was announced on 12 July 2021. On 28 July, José Toledo was replaced by Henrique Teixeira.

Head coach: Marcus Oliveira

No.	Pos.	Name	Date of birth (age)	Height	App.	Goals	Club
2	CB	Henrique Teixeira	27 February 1989 (aged 32)	1.92 m	131	203	(Romania) CSM București
4	CB	João Silva	29 January 1994 (aged 27)	1.90 m	64	114	(Spain) BM Puente Genil
5	LW	Guilherme Torriani	6 February 1999 (aged 22)	1.86 m	16	27	(Brazil) HC Taubaté
10	RB	José Toledo	11 January 1994 (aged 27)	1.93 m	89	224	(Romania) CS Minaur Baia Mare
13	P	Rogério Moraes Ferreira	11 January 1994 (aged 27)	2.04 m	44	98	Not attached
14	LB	Thiagus Petrus	25 January 1989 (aged 32)	1.98 m	152	228	(Spain) FC Barcelona
16	GK	Rangel da Rosa	11 May 1996 (aged 25)	1.89 m	34	3	(Spain) CB Ciudad de Logroño
18	LW	Felipe Borges	4 May 1985 (aged 36)	1.88 m	223	796	(France) US Créteil Handball
19	RW	Fábio Chiuffa	10 March 1989 (aged 32)	1.87 m	157	404	(Romania) HC Dobrogea Sud Constanța
25	P	Vinícius Teixeira	3 April 1988 (aged 33)	1.88 m	146	551	(Brazil) HC Taubaté
33	CB	Leonardo Dutra	29 March 1996 (aged 25)	1.84 m	27	63	(Spain) CB Ciudad de Logroño
35	LB	Thiago Ponciano	8 May 1994 (aged 27)	1.93 m	39	26	(Spain) Ciudad Encantada
37	LB	Haniel Langaro	7 March 1995 (aged 26)	1.97 m	82	364	(Spain) FC Barcelona
62	GK	Leonardo Terçariol	14 April 1987 (aged 34)	1.94 m	53	3	(Spain) BM Benidorm
77	RW	Rudolph Hackbarth	10 March 1994 (aged 27)	1.89 m	51	126	(Spain) CB Ciudad de Logroño
95	RB	Gustavo Rodrigues	9 April 1995 (aged 26)	1.90 m	47	115	(France) Chambéry Savoie Handball

Group play

Pos	Team	Pld	W	D	L	GF	GA	GD	Pts	Qualification
1	France	5	4	0	1	162	148	+14	8 (Note: France 36–31 Spain)	Quarter-finals
2	Spain	5	4	0	1	155	142	+13	8	Quarter-finals
3	Germany	5	3	0	2	146	131	+15	6 (Note: Germany 28–23 Norway)	Quarter-finals
4	Norway	5	3	0	2	136	132	+4	6	Quarter-finals
5	Brazil	5	1	0	4	128	145	−17	2	
6	Argentina	5	0	0	5	125	154	−29	0	

Source: Tokyo 2020 and IHF
Rules for classification: 1) Points; 2) Head-to-head points; 3) Head-to-head goal difference; 4) Head-to-head goals scored; 5) Goal difference; 6) Goals scored; 7) Draw.
Notes:

24 July 2021; 09:00	Norway	27–24	Brazil	Yoyogi National Gymnasium, Tokyo; Referees: Horáček, Novotný (CZE)
24 July 2021; 09:00	Sagosen 8	(12–13)	Langaro 5	Yoyogi National Gymnasium, Tokyo; Referees: Horáček, Novotný (CZE)
24 July 2021; 09:00		Report	1× (yellow card) 6× (suspension) 1× (red card)	Yoyogi National Gymnasium, Tokyo; Referees: Horáček, Novotný (CZE)

26 July 2021; 09:00	Brazil	29–34	France	Yoyogi National Gymnasium, Tokyo; Referees: Kurtagic, Wetterwik (SWE)
26 July 2021; 09:00	Dutra 10	(13–16)	three players 4	Yoyogi National Gymnasium, Tokyo; Referees: Kurtagic, Wetterwik (SWE)
26 July 2021; 09:00	4× (suspension) 1× (red card)	Report	2× (suspension)	Yoyogi National Gymnasium, Tokyo; Referees: Kurtagic, Wetterwik (SWE)

28 July 2021; 19:30	Brazil	25–32	Spain	Yoyogi National Gymnasium, Tokyo; Referees: Hansen, Madsen (DEN)
28 July 2021; 19:30	Silva 6	(16–18)	Solé 5	Yoyogi National Gymnasium, Tokyo; Referees: Hansen, Madsen (DEN)
28 July 2021; 19:30	4× (suspension)	Report	1× (yellow card) 1× (suspension)	Yoyogi National Gymnasium, Tokyo; Referees: Hansen, Madsen (DEN)

30 July 2021; 09:00	Argentina	23–25	Brazil	Yoyogi National Gymnasium, Tokyo; Referees: Lah, Sok (SLO)
30 July 2021; 09:00	Martínez 6	(7–14)	Silva 7	Yoyogi National Gymnasium, Tokyo; Referees: Lah, Sok (SLO)
30 July 2021; 09:00	2× (yellow card) 4× (suspension) 1× (red card)	Report	1× (yellow card) 5× (suspension) 1× (red card)	Yoyogi National Gymnasium, Tokyo; Referees: Lah, Sok (SLO)

1 August 2021; 19:30	Germany	29–25	Brazil	Yoyogi National Gymnasium, Tokyo; Referees: Horáček, Novotný (CZE)
1 August 2021; 19:30	Knorr, Weinhold 6	(16–12)	Dutra 7	Yoyogi National Gymnasium, Tokyo; Referees: Horáček, Novotný (CZE)
1 August 2021; 19:30	1× (yellow card) 3× (suspension)	Report	2× (yellow card) 2× (suspension)	Yoyogi National Gymnasium, Tokyo; Referees: Horáček, Novotný (CZE)

=== Women's tournament ===
Brazil women's handball team qualified for the Olympics by winning the gold medal and securing an outright berth at the final match of the 2019 Pan American Games in Lima.

Team roster

The squad was announced on 12 July 2021.

Head coach: (Spain) Jorge Dueñas

No.	Pos.	Name	Date of birth (age)	Height	App.	Goals	Club
2	CB	Bruna de Paula	26 September 1996 (aged 24)	1.70 m	57	142	(France) Metz HB
3	RW	Alexandra do Nascimento	16 September 1981 (aged 39)	1.77 m	196	749	(France) Bourg-de-Péage DHB
7	P	Tamires Morena Lima	16 May 1994 (aged 27)	1.83 m	104	148	(Romania) HC Dunărea Brăila
9	CB	Ana Paula Belo	18 October 1987 (aged 33)	1.72 m	190	703	(Romania) HC Dunărea Brăila
12	GK	Bárbara Arenhart	4 October 1986 (aged 34)	1.81 m	166	10	(Slovenia) RK Krim
18	LB	Eduarda Amorim	23 September 1986 (aged 34)	1.86 m	206	683	(Russia) Rostov-Don
20	LW	Larissa Araújo	1 July 1992 (aged 29)	1.67 m	53	107	(Romania) HC Dunărea Brăila
21	RW	Adriana Cardoso	29 October 1990 (aged 30)	1.67 m	33	102	(Spain) BM Bera Bera
22	LB	Samara Vieira	7 October 1991 (aged 29)	1.83 m	24	49	(Romania) HC Dunărea Brăila
23	LB	Giulia Guarieiro	3 April 1988 (aged 33)	1.74 m	2	0	(Spain) BM Granollers
30	RB	Gabriela Bitolo	1 April 1999 (aged 22)	1.80 m	8	4	(Spain) CB Elche
49	CB	Patrícia Matieli	8 November 1988 (aged 32)	1.68 m	47	50	(Poland) Zagłębie Lubin
77	LW	Dayane Rocha	24 March 1991 (aged 30)	1.68 m	64	74	(Spain) CB Salud Tenerife
87	GK	Renata Arruda	18 February 1999 (aged 22)	1.78 m	23	3	(Spain) BM Bera Bera
91	P	Lívia Ventura	18 January 1987 (aged 34)	1.70 m	17	23	(Portugal) Madeira Andebol SAD

Group play

Pos	Team	Pld	W	D	L	GF	GA	GD	Pts	Qualification
1	Sweden	5	3	1	1	152	133	+19	7 (Note: Sweden 36–24 ROC)	Quarter-finals
2	ROC	5	3	1	1	148	149	−1	7	Quarter-finals
3	France	5	2	1	2	139	135	+4	5	Quarter-finals
4	Hungary	5	2	0	3	142	149	−7	4 (Note: Hungary 29–25 Spain)	Quarter-finals
5	Spain	5	2	0	3	135	142	−7	4	
6	Brazil	5	1	1	3	133	141	−8	3	

Source: Tokyo 2020 and IHF
Rules for classification: 1) Points; 2) Head-to-head points; 3) Head-to-head goal difference; 4) Head-to-head goals scored; 5) Goal difference; 6) Goals scored; 7) Draw.
Notes:

25 July 2021; 11:00	ROC	24–24	Brazil	Yoyogi National Gymnasium, Tokyo; Referees: Fonseca, Santos (POR)
25 July 2021; 11:00	Ilyina 6	(14–12)	De Paula 7	Yoyogi National Gymnasium, Tokyo; Referees: Fonseca, Santos (POR)
25 July 2021; 11:00	2× (yellow card) 3× (suspension)	Report	1× (yellow card) 4× (suspension)	Yoyogi National Gymnasium, Tokyo; Referees: Fonseca, Santos (POR)

27 July 2021; 11:00	Brazil	33–27	Hungary	Yoyogi National Gymnasium, Tokyo; Referees: Koo, Lee (KOR)
27 July 2021; 11:00	Belo, Vieira 7	(17–11)	Schatzl 7	Yoyogi National Gymnasium, Tokyo; Referees: Koo, Lee (KOR)
27 July 2021; 11:00	1× (yellow card) 4× (suspension)	Report	3× (suspension)	Yoyogi National Gymnasium, Tokyo; Referees: Koo, Lee (KOR)

29 July 2021; 11:00	Spain	27–23	Brazil	Yoyogi National Gymnasium, Tokyo; Referees: Hansen, Madsen (DEN)
29 July 2021; 11:00	Pena 7	(13–13)	De Paula 8	Yoyogi National Gymnasium, Tokyo; Referees: Hansen, Madsen (DEN)
29 July 2021; 11:00	1× (yellow card) 1× (suspension)	Report	1× (yellow card) 3× (suspension)	Yoyogi National Gymnasium, Tokyo; Referees: Hansen, Madsen (DEN)

31 July 2021; 16:15	Brazil	31–34	Sweden	Yoyogi National Gymnasium, Tokyo; Referees: Koo, Lee (KOR)
31 July 2021; 16:15	Do Nascimento 7	(13–15)	Hansson, Roberts 6	Yoyogi National Gymnasium, Tokyo; Referees: Koo, Lee (KOR)
31 July 2021; 16:15	1× (yellow card) 4× (suspension)	Report	5× (suspension)	Yoyogi National Gymnasium, Tokyo; Referees: Koo, Lee (KOR)

2 August 2021; 11:00	France	29–22	Brazil	Yoyogi National Gymnasium, Tokyo; Referees: Lah, Sok (SLO)
2 August 2021; 11:00	Lassource, Pineau 4	(17–11)	Do Nascimento 6	Yoyogi National Gymnasium, Tokyo; Referees: Lah, Sok (SLO)
2 August 2021; 11:00	2× (suspension)	Report	2× (suspension)	Yoyogi National Gymnasium, Tokyo; Referees: Lah, Sok (SLO)

== Judo ==
Brazil qualified a squad of 13 judoka (seven men and six women) for each of the following weight classes at the Games by virtue of their top 18 finish in the IJF World Ranking List of 28 June 2021. The judo team was named to the Olympic roster on 16 June 2021, including Olympic bronze medalists Rafael Silva and Mayra Aguiar (London 2012 and Rio 2016) and Ketleyn Quadros (Beijing 2008).

Men

Athlete	Event	Round of 64	Round of 32	Round of 16	Quarterfinals	Semifinals	Repechage	Final / BM	
Athlete	Event	Opposition Result	Opposition Result	Opposition Result	Opposition Result	Opposition Result	Opposition Result	Opposition Result	Rank
Eric Takabatake	−60 kg	—N/a	Sithisane (LAO); W 10–00	Kim W-j (KOR); L 00–10	did not advance				
Daniel Cargnin	−66 kg	—N/a	Abdelmawgoud (EGY); W 10–00	Vieru (MDA); W 01–00	Lombardo (ITA); W 01–00	Abe (JPN); L 00–10	—N/a	Shmailov (ISR); W 01–00	3rd place, bronze medalist(s)
Eduardo Barbosa	−73 kg	Chaine (FRA); L 00–10	Did not advance						
Eduardo Yudy Santos	−81 kg	Bye	Muki (ISR); L 00–10	Did not advance					
Rafael Macedo	−90 kg	Bozbayev (KAZ); L 00–10	Did not advance						
Rafael Buzacarini	−100 kg	—N/a	Nikiforov (BEL); L 00–01	Did not advance					
Rafael Silva	+100 kg	—N/a	Bye	Kokauri (AZE); W 10–00	Tushishvili (GEO); L 00–10	—N/a	Riner (FRA); L 00–11	Did not advance	

Women

Athlete	Event	Round of 32	Round of 16	Quarterfinals	Semifinals	Repechage	Final / BM	
Athlete	Event	Opposition Result	Opposition Result	Opposition Result	Opposition Result	Opposition Result	Opposition Result	Rank
Gabriela Chibana	−48 kg	Boniface (MAW); W 10–00	Krasniqi (KOS); L 00–10	Did not advance				
Larissa Pimenta	−52 kg	Perenc (POL); W 01–00	Abe (JPN); L 00–10	Did not advance				
Ketleyn Quadros	−63 kg	David (HON); W 10–00	Bold (MGL); W 10–00	Beauchemin-Pinard (CAN); L 00–10	—N/a	Franssen (NED); L 00–10	Did not advance	
Maria Portela	−70 kg	Shaheen (EOR); W 10–00	Taimazova (ROC); L 00–10	Did not advance				
Mayra Aguiar	−78 kg	Bye	Lanir (ISR); W 10–00	Wagner (GER); L 00–01	—N/a	Babintseva (ROC); W 10–00	Yoon H-j (KOR); W 10–00	3rd place, bronze medalist(s)
Maria Suelen Altheman	+78 kg	Bye	Velenšek (SLO); W 10–00	Dicko (FRA); L 00–11	—N/a	Xu Sy (CHN); L FUS	Did not advance	

Mixed

Athlete	Event	Round of 16	Quarterfinals	Semifinals	Repechage	Final / BM	
Athlete	Event	Opposition Result	Opposition Result	Opposition Result	Opposition Result	Opposition Result	Rank
Mayra Aguiar; Eduardo Barbosa; Rafael Buzacarini; Daniel Cargnin; Rafael Macedo; Larissa Pimenta; Maria Portela; Rafael Silva; Eduardo Yudy Santos	Team	Bye	Netherlands; L 2–4	Did not advance	Israel; L 2–4	Did not advance	

== Modern pentathlon ==
Brazilian athletes qualified for the following spots to compete in modern pentathlon. Maria Iêda Guimarães secured a selection in women's event by finishing in the top two for Latin America and fourth overall at the 2019 Pan American Games in Lima.

Athlete	Event	Fencing (épée one touch)				Swimming (200 m freestyle)			Riding (show jumping)			Combined: shooting/running (10 m air pistol)/(3200 m)			Total points	Final rank
Athlete	Event	RR	BR	Rank	MP points	Time	Rank	MP points	Penalties	Rank	MP points	Time	Rank	MP points	Total points	Final rank
Maria Iêda Guimarães	Women's	184	0	30	184	2:32.16	6	246	EL	31	0	DNF	36	0	430	36

== Rowing ==
Brazil qualified one boat in the men's single sculls for the Games by winning the gold medal and securing the first of five berths available at the 2021 FISA Americas Olympic Qualification Regatta in Rio de Janeiro.

Athlete	Event	Heats		Repechage		Quarterfinals		Semifinals		Final	
Athlete	Event	Time	Rank	Time	Rank	Time	Rank	Time	Rank	Time	Rank
Lucas Verthein	Men's single sculls	7:05.00	3 QF	Bye		7:14.26	2 SA/B	7:02.87	5 FB	6:52.09	12

Qualification Legend: FA=Final A (medal); FB=Final B (non-medal); FC=Final C (non-medal); FD=Final D (non-medal); FE=Final E (non-medal); FF=Final F (non-medal); SA/B=Semifinals A/B; SC/D=Semifinals C/D; SE/F=Semifinals E/F; QF=Quarterfinals; R=Repechage

== Rugby sevens ==
Summary

Team	Event	Group Stage				Quarterfinal	9–12th semi-finals	11 place match	
Team	Event	Opposition Score	Opposition Score	Opposition Score	Rank	Opposition Score	Opposition Score	Opposition Score	Rank
Brazil women's	Women's tournament	Canada; L 0–33	France; L 5–40	Fiji; L 5–41	4	—N/a	Canada; L 0–45	Japan; W 21–12	11

=== Women's tournament ===
The Brazil women's national rugby sevens team qualified for the Olympics by winning the gold medal and securing a lone outright berth at the 2019 Sudamérica Rugby Women's Sevens Olympic Qualifying Tournament in Lima, Peru.

Team roster

Brazil's squad of 12 player was named on 28 June 2021.

Head coach: Will Broderick

- Luiza Campos
- Isadora Cerullo
- Thalia Costa
- Thalita Costa
- Marina Fioravanti
- Aline Furtado
- Raquel Kochhann (c)
- Mariana Nicolau
- Haline Scatrut
- Bianca Silva
- Leila Cássia Silva
- Rafaela Zanellato

Group B

Pos	Team	Pld	W	D	L	PF	PA	PD	Pts	Qualification
1	France	3	3	0	0	83	10	+73	9	Quarter-finals
2	Fiji	3	2	0	1	72	29	+43	7	Quarter-finals
3	Canada	3	1	0	2	45	57	−12	5	
4	Brazil	3	0	0	3	10	114	−104	3	

Source: Tokyo 2020 and World Rugby
Rules for classification: 1) Points; 2) Head-to-head result; 3) Point difference; 4) Points scored.

29 July 2021
9:30

Canada	33–0	Brazil
Try: Williams 6' c Wardley (2) 9' c, 14' +1 m Paquin 11' c Landry 13' c Con: Landry (4/5) 7', 9', 11', 13'	(Tokyo 2020)

Tokyo Stadium, Tokyo

29 July 2021
17:00

France	40–5	Brazil
Try: Ciofani (2) 2' c, 4' m Guérin (2) 6' c, 9' c Ulutule 11' c Grassineau 14' c Con: Ulutule (2/3) 3', 7'; Izar (3/3) 9', 11', 14' +1	(Tokyo 2020)	Try: Silva 8' m Con: Kochhann (0/1)

Tokyo Stadium, Tokyo

30 July 2021
9:00

Fiji	41–5	Brazil
Try: Nakoci 4' c Ulunisau (4) 5' c, 7' m, 10' m, 12' m Naimasi 8' m Likuceva 14' c Con: Cavuru (2/4) 5', 5'; Riwai (1/3) 14'	(Tokyo 2020)	Try: Silva 2' m Con: Kochhann (0/1)

Tokyo Stadium, Tokyo

9–12th place playoff

30 July 2021
16:30

Canada	45–0	Brazil
Try: Williams (3) 2' c, 6' m, 10' c Paquin (2) 7' c, 8' c Benn 8' c Greenshields 14' c Con: Landry (4/6) 3', 8', 9', 10'; Nicholas (1/1) 14'	(Tokyo 2020)

Tokyo Stadium, Tokyo

11th place match

31 July 2021
9:00

Brazil	21–12	Japan
Try: Kochhann 2' c Silva 7' c Fioravanti 13' c Con: Cerullo (2/2) 2', 7'; Kochhann (1/1) 13'	(Tokyo 2020)	Try: Hirotsu 3' c Hara 6' m Con: Yamanaka (1/2) 4'

Tokyo Stadium, Tokyo

== Sailing ==
Brazilian sailors qualified one boat in each of the following classes through the 2018 Sailing World Championships, the class-associated Worlds, the 2019 Pan American Games, and the continental regattas.

After meeting the selection criteria at the 2020 Laser Worlds, multiple medalist Robert Scheidt was officially named to the country's sailing fleet. Moreover, he established a historic record as the first ever Brazilian to participate in seven straight Olympics. Skiff siblings and Rio 2016 Olympians Marco and Martine Grael, along with their respective partners Gabriel Borges (49er) and Kahena Kunze (49erFX), were added to the roster on 16 February 2020. Finn sailor and two-time Olympian Jorge Zarif and the Nacra 17 crew (Samuel Albrecht and his new partner Gabriela Nicolino de Sá) secured their places at the 2020 Copa Brasil, while Rio 2016 Olympians Bruno Bethlem and Henrique Haddad topped the sailing fleet at the national selection trials for the men's 470 to join the Tokyo 2020 roster.

Men

Athlete	Event	Race													Net points	Final rank
Athlete	Event	1	2	3	4	5	6	7	8	9	10	11	12	M*	Net points	Final rank
Robert Scheidt	Laser	11	10	4	3	17	5	8	12	~~24~~	16	—N/a		9	104	8
Jorge Zarif	Finn	7	15	15	9	5	11	14	13	6	~~16~~	—N/a		EL	95	14
Bruno Bethlem; Henrique Haddad	470	16	3	17	2	18	~~19~~	12	17	16	15	—N/a		EL	118	16
Gabriel Borges; Marco Grael	49er	8	16	12	9	~~DSQ~~	DSQ	UFD	8	6	19	11	18	EL	147	16

Women

Athlete	Event	Race													Net points	Final rank
Athlete	Event	1	2	3	4	5	6	7	8	9	10	11	12	M*	Net points	Final rank
Patricia Freitas	RS:X	13	14	4	11	12	10	9	7	~~19~~	10	15	12	8	133	10
Ana Barbachan; Fernanda Oliveira	470	~~15~~	5	1	10	13	4	10	10	8	1	—N/a		20	82	9
Martine Grael; Kahena Kunze	49erFX	~~15~~	5	1	10	7	6	1	6	10	12	2	10	6	76	1st place, gold medalist(s)

Mixed

Athlete	Event	Race													Net points	Final rank
Athlete	Event	1	2	3	4	5	6	7	8	9	10	11	12	M*	Net points	Final rank
Samuel Albrecht; Gabriela Nicolino de Sá	Nacra 17	10	14	9	9	10	10	2	7	6	~~18~~	10	10	20	117	10

M = Medal race; EL = Eliminated – did not advance into the medal race

== Shooting ==
Brazil granted an invitation from ISSF to send Rio 2016 silver medalist Felipe Almeida Wu (men's 10 m air pistol) to the rescheduled Games as the highest-ranked shooter vying for qualification in the ISSF World Olympic Rankings of 6 June 2021.

Athlete	Event	Qualification		Final	
Athlete	Event	Points	Rank	Points	Rank
Felipe Almeida Wu	Men's 10 m air pistol	566	32	Did not advance	

== Skateboarding ==
Brazil entered twelve skateboarders (six per gender) to compete in each of the following events at the Games based on the World Skate Olympic Rankings List of 30 June 2021.

Park

Athlete	Event	Qualification		Final	
Athlete	Event	Score	Rank	Score	Rank
Pedro Barros	Men's park	77.14	4 Q	86.14	2nd place, silver medalist(s)
Luiz Francisco	Men's park	84.31	1 Q	83.14	4
Pedro Quintas	Men's park	79.02	3 Q	38.47	8
Yndiara Asp	Women's park	43.23	7 Q	37.34	8
Isadora Pacheco	Women's park	37.08	10	Did not advance	
Dora Varella	Women's park	41.59	8 Q	40.42	7

Street

Athlete	Event	Qualification		Final	
Athlete	Event	Score	Rank	Score	Rank
Felipe Gustavo	Men's street	24.75	14	Did not advance	
Kelvin Hoefler	Men's street	34.69	4 Q	36.15	2nd place, silver medalist(s)
Giovanni Vianna	Men's street	28.15	12	Did not advance	
Letícia Bufoni	Women's street	10.91	9	Did not advance	
Rayssa Leal	Women's street	14.91	3 Q	14.64	2nd place, silver medalist(s)
Pamela Rosa	Women's street	10.06	10	Did not advance	

== Surfing ==
Brazil sent four surfers (two per gender) to compete in the shortboard at the Games. Two-time world champion Gabriel Medina, one-time world champion Ítalo Ferreira, Silvana Lima, and Tatiana Weston-Webb finished within the top ten (for men) and top eight (for women), respectively, of those eligible for qualification in the World Surf League rankings to secure their spots on the Brazilian roster for Tokyo 2020.

Athlete	Event	Round 1		Round 2		Round 3	Quarterfinal	Semifinal	Final / BM	
Athlete	Event	Score	Rank	Score	Rank	Opposition Result	Opposition Result	Opposition Result	Opposition Result	Rank
Ítalo Ferreira	Men's shortboard	13.67	1 Q	Bye		Stairmand (NZL); W 14.54–9.567	Ohhara (JPN); W 16.30–11.90	Wright (AUS); W 13.17–12.47	Igarashi (JPN); W 15.14–6.60	1st place, gold medalist(s)
Gabriel Medina	Men's shortboard	12.23	1 Q	Bye		Wilson (AUS); W 14.33–13.00	Bourez (FRA); W 15.33–13.66	Igarashi (JPN); L 16.76–17.00	Wright (AUS); L 11.77–11.97	4
Silvana Lima	Women's shortboard	12.13	2 Q	Bye		Bonvalot (POR); W 12.17–7.50	Moore (USA); L 8.30–14.26	Did not advance		
Tatiana Weston-Webb	Women's shortboard	11.33	1 Q	Bye		Tsuzuki (JPN); L 9.00–10.33	Did not advance			

== Swimming ==
Brazilian swimmers further achieved qualifying standards in the following events (up to a maximum of 2 swimmers in each event at the Olympic Qualifying Time (OQT), and potentially 1 at the Olympic Selection Time (OST)). To secure their nomination to the Olympic team, swimmers must finish in the top two of each individual pool event under the FINA Olympic qualifying standard at the Brazilian Olympic Trials (19 to 24 April) in Rio de Janeiro.

Men

Athlete	Event	Heat		Semifinal		Final	
Athlete	Event	Time	Rank	Time	Rank	Time	Rank
Bruno Fratus	50 m freestyle	21.67	4 Q	21.60	=3 Q	21.57	3rd place, bronze medalist(s)
Pedro Spajari	100 m freestyle	48.74	25	Did not advance			
Gabriel Santos	100 m freestyle	49.33	32	Did not advance			
Murilo Sartori	200 m freestyle	1:47.11	24	Did not advance			
Fernando Scheffer	200 m freestyle	1:45.05 SA	2 Q	1:45.71	8 Q	1:44.66 SA	3rd place, bronze medalist(s)
Guilherme Costa	400 m freestyle	3:45.99	11	—N/a		Did not advance	
Guilherme Costa	800 m freestyle	7:46.09 SA	5 Q	—N/a		7:53.31	8
Guilherme Costa	1500 m freestyle	15:01.18	13	—N/a		Did not advance	
Guilherme Guido	100 m backstroke	53.65	11 Q	53.80	15	Did not advance	
Guilherme Basseto	100 m backstroke	53.84	20	Did not advance			
Felipe Lima	100 m breaststroke	59.17	8 Q	59.80	12	Did not advance	
Caio Pumputis	100 m breaststroke	1:00.76	34	Did not advance			
Caio Pumputis	200 m individual medley	1:58.36	19	Did not advance			
Vinicius Lanza	100 m butterfly	52.08	26	did not advance			
Vinicius Lanza	200 m individual medley	1:58.92	25	Did not advance			
Matheus Gonche	100 m butterfly	53.02	43	Did not advance			
Leonardo de Deus	200 m butterfly	1:54.83	3 Q	1:54.97	2 Q	1:55.19	6
Marcelo Chierighini; Breno Correia; Gabriel Santos; Pedro Spajari	4 × 100 m freestyle relay	3:12.59	5 Q	—N/a		3:13.41	8
Breno Correia; Luiz Altamir Melo; Murilo Sartori; Fernando Scheffer	4 × 200 m freestyle relay	7:07.73	8 Q	—N/a		7:08.22	8
Marcelo Chierighini; Guilherme Guido; Vinicius Lanza; Felipe Lima	4 × 100 m medley relay	DSQ		—N/a		Did not advance	

Women

Athlete	Event	Heat		Semifinal		Final	
Athlete	Event	Time	Rank	Time	Rank	Time	Rank
Etiene Medeiros	50 m freestyle	25.45	29	Did not advance			
Larissa Oliveira	100 m freestyle	55.53	30	Did not advance			
Viviane Jungblut	800 m freestyle	8:38.88	24	—N/a		Did not advance	
Viviane Jungblut	1500 m freestyle	16:21.29	20	—N/a		Did not advance	
Beatriz Dizotti	1500 m freestyle	16:29.37	24	—N/a		Did not advance	
Stephanie Balduccini; Etiene Medeiros; Larissa Oliveira; Ana Carolina Vieira	4 × 100 m freestyle relay	3:39.19	12	—N/a		Did not advance	
Nathália Almeida; Larissa Oliveira; Gabrielle Roncatto; Aline Rodrigues	4 × 200 m freestyle relay	7:59.50	10	—N/a		Did not advance	
Ana Marcela Cunha	10 km open water	—N/a				1:59:30.8	1st place, gold medalist(s)

Mixed

Athlete	Event	Heat		Final	
Athlete	Event	Result	Rank	Result	Rank
Stephanie Balduccini; Guilherme Basseto; Giovanna Diamante; Felipe Lima	4 × 100 m medley relay	3:46.74	14	Did not advance	

== Table tennis ==
Brazil entered six athletes into the table tennis competition at the Games. The men's and women's teams secured their respective Olympic berths by winning the gold medal each at the Latin America Qualification Event in Lima, Peru, permitting a maximum of two starters to compete each in the men's and women's singles tournament.

Men

Athlete	Event	Preliminary	Round 1	Round 2	Round 3	Round of 16	Quarterfinals	Semifinals	Final / BM	
Athlete	Event	Opposition Result	Opposition Result	Opposition Result	Opposition Result	Opposition Result	Opposition Result	Opposition Result	Opposition Result	Rank
Hugo Calderano	Singles	Bye			Tokić (SLO); W 4–1	Jang W-j (KOR); W 4–3	Ovtcharov (GER); L 2–4	Did not advance		
Gustavo Tsuboi	Singles	Bye		Ionescu (ROU); W 4–1	Aruna (NGR); W 4–2	Lin Y-j (TPE); L 2–4	Did not advance			
Hugo Calderano; Vitor Ishiy; Gustavo Tsuboi	Team	—N/a				Serbia; W 3–2	South Korea; L 0–3	Did not advance		

Women

Athlete	Event	Preliminary	Round 1	Round 2	Round 3	Round of 16	Quarterfinals	Semifinals	Final / BM	
Athlete	Event	Opposition Result	Opposition Result	Opposition Result	Opposition Result	Opposition Result	Opposition Result	Opposition Result	Opposition Result	Rank
Bruna Takahashi	Singles	Bye		Yuan (FRA); L 0–4	Did not advance					
Jéssica Yamada	Singles	Bye	Moret (SUI); L 2–4	Did not advance						
Caroline Kumahara; Bruna Takahashi; Jéssica Yamada	Team	—N/a				Hong Kong; L 1–3	Did not advance			

== Taekwondo ==
Brazil entered three athletes into the taekwondo competition at the Games. 2019 Pan American Games champions Edival Pontes (men's 68 kg) and Milena Titoneli (women's 67 kg), along with silver medalist Ícaro Miguel Soares (men's 80 kg) secured the spots on the Brazilian squad with a top two finish each in their respective weight classes at the 2020 Pan American Qualification Tournament in San José, Costa Rica.

Athlete	Event	Round of 16	Quarterfinals	Semifinals	Repechage	Final / BM	
Athlete	Event	Opposition Result	Opposition Result	Opposition Result	Opposition Result	Opposition Result	Rank
Edival Pontes	Men's −68 kg	Reçber (TUR); L 18–25	Did not advance				
Ícaro Miguel Soares	Men's −80 kg	Alessio (ITA); L 3–22	Did not advance				
Milena Titoneli	Women's −67 kg	Al-Sadeq (JOR); W 9–9 SUP	Jelić (CRO); L 9–30 PTG	Did not advance	Lee (HAI); W 26–5 PTG	Gbagbi (CIV); L 8–12	5

== Tennis ==
Brazil entered six tennis players (four men and two women) into the Olympic tournament. João Menezes secured an outright berth in the men's singles by advancing to the final match at the 2019 Pan American Games in Lima, with Thiago Monteiro (world no. 83) joining him based on the ATP World Rankings of June 13, 2021.

Having been directly entered into the singles, Monteiro opted to play with his partner Marcelo Demoliner in the men's doubles, following the eventual withdrawals of several tennis players, with Marcelo Melo and Bruno Soares teaming up for the third consecutive time at the Games by finishing among the world's top 20 in the ATP Doubles Rankings. On the women's side, Luisa Stefani and Laura Pigossi granted an invitation from ITF to compete in the doubles, as several tennis players opted to withdraw from the tournament.

Soares felt a severe abdominal pain during the flight to Tokyo. He was diagnosed with appendicitis and had to undergo surgery, preventing him from his participation at the Games. Instead, his partner Melo officially paired up with Demoliner.

Athlete	Event	Round of 64	Round of 32	Round of 16	Quarterfinals	Semifinals	Final / BM	
Athlete	Event	Opposition Result	Opposition Result	Opposition Result	Opposition Result	Opposition Result	Opposition Result	Rank
João Menezes	Men's singles	Čilić (CRO); L 7–6^{(7–5)}, 5–7, 6–7^{(7–9)}	did not advance					
Thiago Monteiro	Men's singles	Struff (GER); L 3–6, 4–6	Did not advance					
Marcelo Demoliner; Marcelo Melo	Men's doubles	—N/a	Mektić / Pavić (CRO); L 6–7^{(6–8)}, 4–6	Did not advance				
Laura Pigossi; Luisa Stefani	Women's doubles	—N/a	Dabrowski / Fichman (CAN); W 7–6^{(7–3)}, 6–4	Plíšková / Vondroušová (CZE); W 2–6, 6–4, [13–11]	Mattek-Sands / Pegula (USA); W 1–6, 6–3, [10–6]	Bencic / Golubic (SUI); L 5–7, 3–6	Kudermetova / Vesnina (ROC); W 4–6, 6–4, [11–9]	3rd place, bronze medalist(s)
Luisa Stefani; Marcelo Melo	Mixed doubles	—N/a		Stojanović / Djokovic (SRB); L 3–6, 4–6	Did not advance			

== Triathlon ==
Brazil entered three triathletes (one man and two women) to compete at the Olympics. Manoel Messias, Luisa Baptista, and Vittória Lopes were selected among the top 26 triathletes vying for qualification in their respective events based on the individual ITU World Rankings of 15 June 2021.

Athlete	Event	Time						Rank
Athlete	Event	Swim (1.5 km)	Trans 1	Bike (40 km)	Trans 2	Run (10 km)	Total	Rank
Manoel Messias	Men's	18:37	0:38	57:40	0:33	30:43	1:48:11	28
Luisa Baptista	Women's	20:12	0:44	1:06:04	0:32	38:00	2:05:32	32
Vittória Lopes	Women's	18:26	0:45	1:03:56	0:41	39:21	2:03:09	28

== Volleyball ==
=== Beach ===
Four Brazilian beach volleyball teams (two per gender) qualified directly for the Olympics by virtue of their nation's top 15 placement in the FIVB Olympic Rankings of 13 June 2021.

Athlete	Event	Preliminary round				Repechage	Round of 16	Quarterfinals	Semifinals	Final / BM	
Athlete	Event	Opposition Score	Opposition Score	Opposition Score	Rank	Opposition Score	Opposition Score	Opposition Score	Opposition Score	Opposition Score	Rank
Alison Cerutti; Álvaro Morais Filho	Men's	Azaad / Capogrosso (ARG); W (21–16, 21–17)	Dalhausser / Lucena (USA); L (22–24, 21–19, 13–15)	Brouwer / Meeuwsen (NED) 'W (21–14, 24–22)	1 Q	Bye	Gaxiola / Rubio (MEX); W (21–14, 21–13)	Pļaviņš / Točs (LAT); L (16–21, 19–21)	Did not advance		
Evandro Oliveira; Bruno Oscar Schmidt	Men's	E Grimalt / M Grimalt (CHI); W (21–15, 16–21, 15–12)	Abicha / El Graoui (MAR); W (21–14, 21–16)	Bryl / Fijałek (POL); W (19–21, 21–14, 17–15)	1 Q	Bye	Pļaviņš / Točs (LAT); L (19–21, 18–21)	Did not advance			
Ágatha Bednarczuk; Eduarda Santos Lisboa	Women's	Gallay / Pereyra (ARG); W (21–19, 21–11)	Wang F / Xia Xy (CHN); L (21–14, 21–16)	Bansley / Brandie (CAN); W (21–18, 21–18)	2 Q	Bye	Kozuch / Ludwig (GER); L (19–21, 21–19, 14–16)	Did not advance			
Rebecca Cavalcanti; Ana Patrícia Ramos	Women's	Khadambi / Makokha (KEN); W (21–15, 21–9)	Graudiņa / Kravčenoka (LAT); L (15–21, 21–12, 12–15)	Claes / Sponcil (USA); L (21–17, 19–21, 11–15)	3 Q	Bye	Wang F / Xia Xy (CHN); W (21–14, 23–21)	Heidrich / Vergé-Dépré (SUI); L (19–21, 21–18, 12–15)	Did not advance		

=== Indoor ===
Summary

Team	Event	Group Stage						Quarterfinal	Semifinal	Final / BM	
Team	Event	Opposition Score	Opposition Score	Opposition Score	Opposition Score	Opposition Score	Rank	Opposition Score	Opposition Score	Opposition Score	Rank
Brazil men's	Men's tournament	Tunisia; W 3–0	Argentina; W 3–2	ROC; L 0–3	United States; W 3–1	France; W 3–2	2	Japan; W 3–0	ROC; L 1–3	Argentina; L 2–3	4
Brazil women's	Women's tournament	South Korea; W 3–0	Dominican Republic; W 3–2	Japan; W 3–0	Serbia; W 3–1	Kenya; W 3–0	1	ROC; W 3–1	South Korea; W 3–0	United States; L 0–3	2nd place, silver medalist(s)

==== Men's tournament ====
Brazil men's volleyball team qualified for the Olympics by securing an outright berth as the highest-ranked nation for pool A at the Intercontinental Olympic Qualification Tournament in Varna, Bulgaria.

Team roster

The Brazil roster was announced on 27 June 2021.

Head coach: (Brazil) Renan Dal Zotto

- 1 Bruno Rezende (c) S
- 5 Maurício Borges Silva OH
- 6 Fernando Kreling S
- 8 Wallace de Souza OP
- 9 Yoandy Leal OH
- 12 Isac Santos MB
- 13 Maurício Souza MB
- 14 Douglas Souza OH
- 16 Lucas Saatkamp MB
- 17 Thales Hoss L
- 18 Ricardo Lucarelli OH
- 21 Alan Souza OP

Group play

Pos	Team	Pld	W	L	Pts	SW	SL	SR	SPW	SPL	SPR	Qualification
1	ROC	5	4	1	12	13	5	2.600	427	397	1.076	Quarterfinals
2	Brazil	5	4	1	10	12	8	1.500	476	450	1.058	Quarterfinals
3	Argentina	5	3	2	8	12	10	1.200	476	464	1.026	Quarterfinals
4	France	5	2	3	8	10	10	1.000	449	442	1.016	Quarterfinals
5	United States	5	2	3	6	8	10	0.800	432	412	1.049	
6	Tunisia	5	0	5	1	3	15	0.200	339	434	0.781	

Source: Tokyo 2020 and FIVB
Rules for classification: Tiebreakers

24 July 2021; 12:02 v	Brazil	3–0	Tunisia	Ariake Arena, Tokyo; Referees: Hamid Al-Rousi (UAE), Fabrice Collados (FRA)
24 July 2021; 12:02 v	(25–22, 25–20, 25–15); Results Statistics			Ariake Arena, Tokyo; Referees: Hamid Al-Rousi (UAE), Fabrice Collados (FRA)

26 July 2021; 22:25 v	Brazil	3–2	Argentina	Ariake Arena, Tokyo; Referees: Shin Muranaka (JPN), Luis Macias (MEX)
26 July 2021; 22:25 v	(19–25, 21–25, 25–16, 25–21, 16–14); Results Statistics			Ariake Arena, Tokyo; Referees: Shin Muranaka (JPN), Luis Macias (MEX)

28 July 2021; 22:16 v	Brazil	0–3	ROC	Ariake Arena, Tokyo; Referees: Wojciech Maroszek (POL), Vladimir Simonović (SRB)
28 July 2021; 22:16 v	(22–25, 20–25, 20–25); Results Statistics			Ariake Arena, Tokyo; Referees: Wojciech Maroszek (POL), Vladimir Simonović (SRB)

30 July 2021; 11:05 v	Brazil	3–1	United States	Ariake Arena, Tokyo; Referees: Daniele Rapisarda (ITA), Luis Macias (MEX)
30 July 2021; 11:05 v	(30–32, 25–23, 25–21, 25–20); Results Statistics			Ariake Arena, Tokyo; Referees: Daniele Rapisarda (ITA), Luis Macias (MEX)

1 August 2021; 11:05 v	Brazil	3–2	France	Ariake Arena, Tokyo; Referees: Wojciech Maroszek (POL), Liu Jiang (CHN)
1 August 2021; 11:05 v	(25–22, 37–39, 25–17, 21–25, 20–18); Results Statistics			Ariake Arena, Tokyo; Referees: Wojciech Maroszek (POL), Liu Jiang (CHN)

Quarterfinal

3 August 2021; 13:00 v	Japan	0–3	Brazil	Ariake Arena, Tokyo; Referees: Denny Cespedes (DOM), Liu Jiang (CHN)
3 August 2021; 13:00 v	(20–25, 22–25, 20–25); Results Statistics			Ariake Arena, Tokyo; Referees: Denny Cespedes (DOM), Liu Jiang (CHN)

Semifinal

5 August 2021; 13:00 v	Brazil	1–3	ROC	Ariake Arena, Tokyo; Referees: Daniele Rapisarda (ITA), Wojciech Maroszek (POL)
5 August 2021; 13:00 v	(25–18, 21–25, 24–26, 23–25); Results Statistics			Ariake Arena, Tokyo; Referees: Daniele Rapisarda (ITA), Wojciech Maroszek (POL)

Bronze medal game

7 August 2021; 13:31 v	(bronze) Argentina	3–2	Brazil	Ariake Arena, Tokyo; Referees: Wojciech Maroszek (POL), Fabrice Collados (FRA)
7 August 2021; 13:31 v	(25–23, 20–25, 20–25, 25–17, 15–13); Results Statistics			Ariake Arena, Tokyo; Referees: Wojciech Maroszek (POL), Fabrice Collados (FRA)

==== Women's tournament ====
Brazil women's volleyball team qualified for the Olympics by securing an outright berth as the highest-ranked nation for pool D at the Intercontinental Olympic Qualification Tournament in Uberlândia.

Team roster

The Brazil roster was announced on 26 June 2021.

Head coach: José Roberto Guimarães

- 2 Carol Gattaz MB
- 7 Rosamaria Montibeller OP
- 8 Macris Carneiro S
- 9 Roberta Ratzke S
- 10 Gabriela Guimarães OS
- 11 Tandara Caixeta OP
- 12 Natália Pereira (c) OS
- 15 Ana Carolina da Silva MB
- 16 Fernanda Garay OS
- 17 Ana Cristina de Souza OS
- 18 Camila Brait L
- 20 Ana Beatriz Corrêa MB

Group play

Pos	Team	Pld	W	L	Pts	SW	SL	SR	SPW	SPL	SPR	Qualification
1	Brazil	5	5	0	14	15	3	5.000	434	315	1.378	Quarter-finals
2	Serbia	5	4	1	12	13	3	4.333	381	313	1.217	Quarter-finals
3	South Korea	5	3	2	7	9	10	0.900	374	415	0.901	Quarter-finals
4	Dominican Republic	5	2	3	8	10	10	1.000	411	406	1.012	Quarter-finals
5	Japan (H)	5	1	4	4	6	12	0.500	378	395	0.957	
6	Kenya	5	0	5	0	0	15	0.000	242	376	0.644	

Source: Tokyo 2020 and FIVB
Rules for classification: Tiebreakers
(H) Host

25 July 2021; 21:45	Brazil	3–0	South Korea	Ariake Arena, Tokyo; Referees: Liu Jiang (CHN), Shin Muranaka (JPN)
25 July 2021; 21:45	(25–10, 25–22, 25–19); Results Statistics			Ariake Arena, Tokyo; Referees: Liu Jiang (CHN), Shin Muranaka (JPN)

27 July 2021; 19:40	Brazil	3–2	Dominican Republic	Ariake Arena, Tokyo; Referees: Susana Rodríguez (ESP), Vladimir Simonović (SRB)
27 July 2021; 19:40	(22–25, 25–17, 25–13, 23–25, 15–12); Results Statistics			Ariake Arena, Tokyo; Referees: Susana Rodríguez (ESP), Vladimir Simonović (SRB)

29 July 2021; 19:40	Japan	0–3	Brazil	Ariake Arena, Tokyo; Referees: Denny Cespedes (DOM), Evgeny Makshanov (RUS)
29 July 2021; 19:40	(16–25, 18–25, 24–26); Results Statistics			Ariake Arena, Tokyo; Referees: Denny Cespedes (DOM), Evgeny Makshanov (RUS)

31 July 2021; 16:25	Serbia	1–3	Brazil	Ariake Arena, Tokyo; Referees: Fabrice Collados (FRA), Wojciech Maroszek (POL)
31 July 2021; 16:25	(20–25, 16–25, 25–23, 19–25); Results Statistics			Ariake Arena, Tokyo; Referees: Fabrice Collados (FRA), Wojciech Maroszek (POL)

2 August 2021; 21:45	Brazil	3–0	Kenya	Ariake Arena, Tokyo; Referees: Vladimir Simonović (SRB), Daniele Rapisarda (ITA)
2 August 2021; 21:45	(25–10, 25–16, 25–8); Results Statistics			Ariake Arena, Tokyo; Referees: Vladimir Simonović (SRB), Daniele Rapisarda (ITA)

Quarterfinal

4 August 2021; 21:30	Brazil	3–1	ROC	Ariake Arena, Tokyo; Referees: Fabrice Collados (FRA), Susana Rodríguez (ESP)
4 August 2021; 21:30	(23–25, 25–21, 25–19, 25–22); Results Statistics			Ariake Arena, Tokyo; Referees: Fabrice Collados (FRA), Susana Rodríguez (ESP)

Semifinal

6 August 2021; 21:00	Brazil	3–0	South Korea	Ariake Arena, Tokyo; Referees: Luis Macias (MEX), Denny Cespedes (DOM)
6 August 2021; 21:00	(25–16, 25–16, 25–16); Results Statistics			Ariake Arena, Tokyo; Referees: Luis Macias (MEX), Denny Cespedes (DOM)

Gold medal game

8 August 2021; 13:30	Brazil	0–3	United States	Ariake Arena, Tokyo; Referees: Juraj Mokrý (SVK), Hernán Casamiquela (ARG)
8 August 2021; 13:30	(21–25, 20–25, 14–25); Results Statistics			Ariake Arena, Tokyo; Referees: Juraj Mokrý (SVK), Hernán Casamiquela (ARG)

== Weightlifting ==
Brazil entered two female weightlifters into the Olympic competition. Nathasha Rosa finished seventh of the eight highest-ranked weightlifters in the women's 49 kg category based on the IWF Absolute World Rankings, with two-time Olympian Jaqueline Ferreira topping the field of weightlifters vying for qualification from the Americas in the women's 87 kg category based on the IWF Absolute Continental Rankings. Initially set to compete in the men's +109 kg category at his third Games, Fernando Reis was tested positive for a human growth hormone, which reportedly excluded him from the team.

Athlete	Event	Snatch		Clean & Jerk		Total	Rank
Athlete	Event	Result	Rank	Result	Rank	Total	Rank
Natasha Rosa Figueiredo	Women's −49 kg	78	9	95	8	173	9
Jaqueline Ferreira	Women's −87 kg	100	11	115	12	215	12

== Wrestling ==
Brazil qualified three wrestlers for each of the following classes into the Olympic competition; all of whom advanced to the top two finals to book Olympic spots in the men's Greco-Roman 130 kg and women's freestyle (62 and 76 kg), respectively, at the 2020 Pan American Qualification Tournament in Ottawa, Canada.

Key:

- VT (ranking points: 5–0 or 0–5) – Victory by fall.
- VB (ranking points: 5–0 or 0–5) – Victory by injury (VF for forfeit, VA for withdrawal or disqualification)
- PP (ranking points: 3–1 or 1–3) – Decision by points – the loser with technical points.
- PO (ranking points: 3–0 or 0–3) – Decision by points – the loser without technical points.
- ST (ranking points: 4–0 or 0–4) – Great superiority – the loser without technical points and a margin of victory of at least 8 (Greco-Roman) or 10 (freestyle) points.
- SP (ranking points: 4–1 or 1–4) – Technical superiority – the loser with technical points and a margin of victory of at least 8 (Greco-Roman) or 10 (freestyle) points.

Freestyle

Athlete	Event	Round of 16	Quarterfinal	Semifinal	Repechage	Final / BM	
Athlete	Event	Opposition Result	Opposition Result	Opposition Result	Opposition Result	Opposition Result	Rank
Laís Nunes	Women's −62 kg	Yusein (BUL); L 1–3 ^{PP}	Did not advance				14
Aline Ferreira	Women's −76 kg	Adar (TUR); L 0–3 ^{PO}	Did not advance				14

Greco-Roman

Athlete	Event	Round of 16	Quarterfinal	Semifinal	Repechage	Final / BM	
Athlete	Event	Opposition Result	Opposition Result	Opposition Result	Opposition Result	Opposition Result	Rank
Eduard Soghomonyan	Men's −130 kg	Popp (GER); L 0–3 ^{PO}	Did not advance				13

== See also ==
- Brazil at the 2019 Pan American Games
- Brazil at the 2020 Summer Paralympics
