= Surfing at the 2020 Summer Olympics – Men's shortboard =

Men's shortboard at the Games of the XXXII Olympiad
- Olympic surfing
- Venue: Shidashita Beach, Chiba
- Dates: 25–27 July 2021
- Competitors: 20 from 14 nations
- Winning score: 15.14

Medalists
1st place, gold medalist(s)		Ítalo Ferreira	Brazil
2nd place, silver medalist(s)		Kanoa Igarashi	Japan
3rd place, bronze medalist(s)		Owen Wright	Australia

The men's shortboard competition at the 2020 Summer Olympics in Tokyo was held from 25 to 27 July at the Shidashita Beach, or "Shida", located about 40 miles (64 km) outside of Tokyo in Chiba.

The medals for the competition were presented by Bernard Rajzman, IOC Member, Olympian, and Silver Medalist, Brazil; and the medalists' bouquets were presented by Fernando Aguerre, ISA President; United States.

== Background ==
This was the first time the surfing is held at the Olympics; it was one of five temporary sports selected for Tokyo 2020. Surfing has also been selected as a temporary sport for 2024 Summer Olympics in Paris, France.

Australia and the United States are typically strong surfing nations, with Brazil a significant challenger. American John John Florence, a two-time World Champion with the Pipeline Masters award, was among the favourites, as were 14-year tour veteran Owen Wright of Australia and reigning World Champion Ítalo Ferreira of Brazil.

== Qualification ==
Quota places were allocated to the athletes at the following events:

- Host Country: Japan as host country is allocated 1 place in both men's and women's events. If at least one Japanese surfer has earned a qualification place through other events, the relevant Host Country Place(s) shall be reallocated to the next highest ranked eligible athlete at the 2020 World Surfing Games.
- 2019 World Surf League Championship Tour – the 10 highest ranked men and 8 highest ranked women will be awarded quota places.
- 2019 ISA World Surfing Games – the top finishers from each continent with the exception of the Americas will be awarded a quota place.
- 2019 Pan American Games – the top finisher in men's and women's events will be awarded a quota place.
- 2021 ISA World Surfing Games – the top 4 men and 6 women will be awarded quota places. If a NOC or National Olympic Committee qualifies more than the maximum number of athletes, the 2021 ISA World Surfing Games will prevail and any places earned from 2019 will be reawarded to the next highest finishing athlete(s).

There is a maximum of 2 men and 2 women per NOC.

== Competition format ==
The competition consists of six rounds:

- Round 1: 5 heats of 4 surfers each; the top 2 in each heat (10 total) advance to round 3 while the other 2 from each heat (10 total) go to round 2 (essentially a repechage)
- Round 2: 2 heats of 5 surfers each; the top 3 in each heat (6 total) advance to round 3 while the other 2 in each heat (4 total) are eliminated
- Round 3: Head-to-head competition starts with this round of 16 (8 heats of 2 surfers each; winner advances, loser eliminated)
- Quarterfinals
- Semifinals
- Final and bronze medal match

The length of each heat (20 to 35 minutes) and the maximum number of waves each surfer can ride are determined by the technical director ahead of the day of competition. Scoring for each wave is from 0 to 10, with the best two waves for each surfer counting. Scores are based on the difficulty of manoeuvres performed, innovation and progression, variety, combination, speed, power, and flow of each manoeuvre.

== Schedule ==
H	Heats	QF	Quarter-Finals	SF	Semi-Finals	F	Finals

Schedule
Date	25 Jul		26 Jul	27 Jul		
Men's	R1	R2	R3	QF	SF	F
Women's	R1	R2	R3	QF	SF	F

Competition took place over 3 days between 25 July and 27 July. Due to a tropical storm the inaugural Olympic surfing finals were moved from Thursday 29 July to Tuesday 27 July.

== Results ==
=== Round 1 ===
The first round is non-elimination. Surfers are seeded into five heats of four surfers each, with the top two surfers advancing straight to Round 3. The bottom two surfers are seeded into Round 2, the first elimination round.

==== Heat 1 ====
Rank	Surfer	Nation	Total score	Notes
1	Ítalo Ferreira	Brazil	13.67	R3
2	Hiroto Ohhara	Japan	11.40	R3
3	Leonardo Fioravanti	Italy	9.43	R2
4	Leandro Usuna	Argentina	8.27	R2

==== Heat 2 ====
Rank	Surfer	Nation	Total score	Notes
1	Kanoa Igarashi	Japan	12.77	R3
2	Miguel Tudela	Peru	10.67	R3
3	Billy Stairmand	New Zealand	9.97	R2
4	Jérémy Florès	France	7.63	R2

==== Heat 3 ====
Rank	Surfer	Nation	Total score	Notes
1	Lucca Mesinas	Peru	11.40	R3
2	Kolohe Andino	United States	10.27	R3
3	Rio Waida	Indonesia	9.96	R2
4	Julian Wilson	Australia	8.77	R2

==== Heat 4 ====
Rank	Surfer	Nation	Total score	Notes
1	Owen Wright	Australia	10.40	R3
2	Ramzi Boukhiam	Morocco	10.23	R3
3	John John Florence	United States	8.37	R2
4	Manuel Selman	Chile	6.20	R2

==== Heat 5 ====
Frederico Morais originally qualified to represent Portugal, but was forced to withdraw after he tested positive for COVID-19 shortly before the start of the Games. Carlos Muñoz of Costa Rica was named as a replacement, but he was unable to make the first round of competition.

Rank	Surfer	Nation	Total score	Notes
1	Gabriel Medina	Brazil	12.23	R3
2	Michel Bourez	France	10.10	R3
3	Leon Glatzer	Germany	10.00	R2
4	Carlos Muñoz	Costa Rica	DNS	R2

=== Round 2 ===
The top three surfers from each heat in Round 2 advance to Round 3. The bottom two surfers from each heat are eliminated.

==== Heat 1 ====
Rank	Surfer	Nation	Total score	Notes
1	John John Florence	United States	12.77	R3
2	Rio Waida	Indonesia	11.53	R3
3	Billy Stairmand	New Zealand	11.34	R3
4	Manuel Selman	Chile	9.74	E
5	Carlos Muñoz	Costa Rica	DNS	E

==== Heat 2 ====
Rank	Surfer	Nation	Total score	Notes
1	Leonardo Fioravanti	Italy	12.53	R3
2	Jérémy Florès	France	11.37	R3
3	Julian Wilson	Australia	11.27	R3
4	Leon Glatzer	Germany	10.43	E
5	Leandro Usuna	Argentina	9.67	E

=== Elimination round ===
The winner from each head-to-head heat qualifies to the next round.

3rd round
Kanoa Igarashi (JPN)	14.00
Rio Waida (INA)	12.00
Kolohe Andino (USA)	14.83
John John Florence (USA)	11.60
Michel Bourez (FRA)	12.43
Ramzi Boukhiam (MAR)	9.40
Gabriel Medina (BRA)	14.33
Julian Wilson (AUS)	13.00
Ítalo Ferreira (BRA)	14.54
Billy Stairmand (NZL)	9.67
Hiroto Ohhara (JPN)	10.00
Miguel Tudela (PER)	9.63
Lucca Mesinas (PER)	10.77
Leonardo Fioravanti (ITA)	8.86
Owen Wright (AUS)	15.00
Jérémy Florès (FRA)	12.90

Quarter finals
Kanoa Igarashi (JPN)	12.60
Kolohe Andino (USA)	11.00
Michel Bourez (FRA)	13.66
Gabriel Medina (BRA)	15.33
Ítalo Ferreira (BRA)	16.30
Hiroto Ohhara (JPN)	11.90
Lucca Mesinas (PER)	7.83
Owen Wright (AUS)	12.74

Semifinals
Kanoa Igarashi (JPN)	17.00
Gabriel Medina (BRA)	16.76
Ítalo Ferreira (BRA)	13.17
Owen Wright (AUS)	12.47

Finals
(silver) Kanoa Igarashi (JPN)	6.60
(gold) Ítalo Ferreira (BRA)	15.14
Bronze medal match
Gabriel Medina (BRA)	11.77
(bronze) Owen Wright (AUS)	11.97
