= Billy Stairmand =

New Zealand surfer

Personal information
- Born: 21 October 1989 (age 37) Raglan, New Zealand
- Years active: 2010–present
- Height: 1.70 m (5 ft 7 in)
- Weight: 65 kg (143 lb)

Surfing career
- Sport: Surfing
- Sponsors: Northbeach, Oakley, Hughes Surfboards, DVS, FCS, Gorilla Grip, Raglan Surf Co, Sharpeye Surfboards, Giltrap Skoda

Surfing specifications
- Stance: Regular

Billy Stairmand (born 21 October 1989) is a New Zealand surfer who competed in the men's shortboard event at the 2020 Summer Olympics. He qualified for the 2024 Olympic Games.

== Early life ==
Stairmand was born and raised in Raglan, a beachside town on the North Island of New Zealand known for its surfing spots. He was taught to surf by his father around the age of 10 and began surfing competitively when he was 13.

== Career ==
In 2010 Stairmand won his first national title, as well as his first ASP World Tour victory at the six-star Ferrolterra Movistar Pantin Classic. He established himself on the international scene the following year by defeating ten-time world champion Kelly Slater at the Telstra Drug Aware Pro in Australia. Stairmand won his sixth open men's title at the 2017 national championships, breaking a 30-year record formerly held by five-time champions Wayne Parkes and Iain Buchanan.

In 2019 Stairmand collected victories at the Rip Curl Raglan Pro and the Gold Coast Open. He also finished eighth overall at the 2019 ISA World Surfing Games, earning him qualification for the 2020 Summer Olympics as the highest-placed competitor from Oceania. In March 2020 he suffered a medial collateral ligament (MCL) tear in his left knee while preparing for the Corona Piha Pro in New Zealand, sidelining him for almost three months.

Due to the COVID-19 pandemic, Stairmand had to wait until 2021 to compete at the inaugural Olympic surfing competition in Tokyo. The month before the Games, both he and Ella Williams were confirmed by the New Zealand Olympic Committee as the country's representatives. Stairmand advanced to the elimination round after placing third in the initial heat and third in the repechage, but was eliminated by the reigning world champion and eventual gold medallist Ítalo Ferreira. He also competed for New Zealand at the 2024 Summer Olympics.

== Personal life ==
Stairmand met Cornwall native Liana Parker while competing at a WSL Qualifying Series event in England, and the couple married in 2018.

Apart from surfing, he enjoys basketball, golf, skateboarding and snowboarding.
