= Ella Williams =

New Zealand surfer

Personal information
- Born: Ella Olivia Williams; 13 January 1995 (age 31)
- Height: 5 ft 10 in (178 cm)

Surfing career
- Sport: Surfing

Surfing specifications
- Stance: goofy

Ella Olivia Williams (born 13 January 1995) is a surfer from Whangamatā, New Zealand. At age 18, she became junior world champion in Florianópolis, Brazil. She competed in the inaugural shortboard surfing competition at the 2020 Tokyo Olympics.

== Biography ==
Williams was born in 1995. Born into a family of surfers (her parents Dean and Janine own a surf shop), she started surfing aged four at Raglan. She entered her first surfing competition when she was six, starting in the under-12 category. Aged seven, her family moved to Whangamatā on the Coromandel Peninsula; the beach is known for its good surfing conditions and it is where the Williams family took over the local surf shop in 2002. At Whangamatā, she attended Whangamatā Area School but by her own admission, she "wasn't very good at school".

When she was eight, Williams wrote on a surf poster that she wanted to be world champion and hung it up at her bed so that she would see it whenever she woke up. She started winning competitions from aged 14, much to the complaints of the boys she was beating.

She was not supposed to go to the October–November 2013 World Junior Championship as she was one place outside the rankings. When Australian Ellie-Jean Coffey cancelled her participation due to injury, Williams went to Brazil with ten days' notice. In the final, she beat Brazilian Tatiana Weston-Webb to take the world title. In the following year, Williams turned professional.

At the 2019 ISA World Surfing Games, Williams gained provisional qualification for the 2020 Tokyo Olympics by finishing 29th. New Zealand had been allocated up to two spots for men and women surfers, respectively, but Paige Hareb came eighth at the 2021 ISA World Surfing Games, but only the top seven qualified.

In April 2021, Williams attracted attention by expressing hesitancy to the COVID-19 vaccine despite the "strong" encouragement by the International Olympic Committee and the New Zealand Olympic Committee. Within weeks, she changed her mind and got vaccinated.
