= Surfing at the 2020 Summer Olympics =

Surfing at the Games of the XXXII Olympiad
- Venue: Tsurigasaki Beach, Chiba
- Dates: 25–27 July 2021
- No. of events: 2
- Competitors: 40 from 17 nations

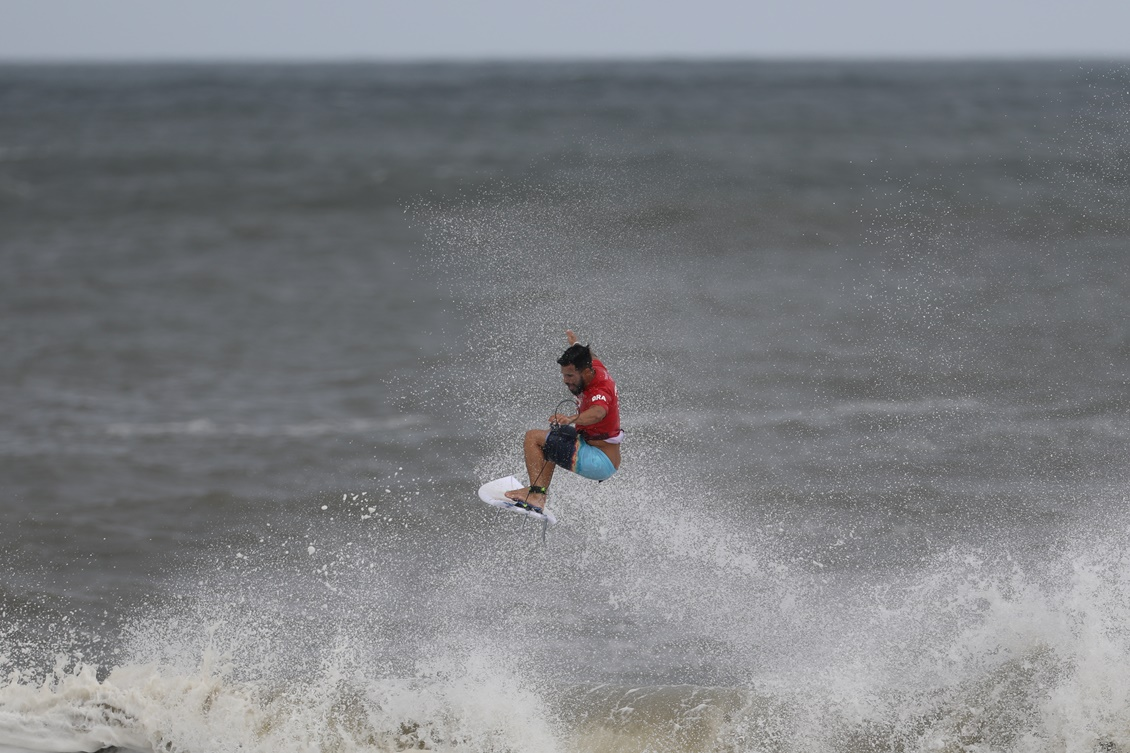
Ítalo Ferreira

Surfing made its Summer Olympics debut in the 2020 Summer Olympics in Tokyo, Japan. The Olympics were originally scheduled to be held in 2020, but were postponed to 2021 as a result of the COVID-19 pandemic.

== Setting ==
In 2018, the International Surfing Association (ISA) announced that surfing at the 2020 Summer Olympics would take place in the ocean, and not in an artificial wave pool. The contest site for the 2020 Games was announced to be Tsurigasaki Beach located about 40 miles (64 km) outside of Tokyo in Ichinomiya, Chiba. To ensure quality surf, the contest featured a waiting period of 16 days. When the event ran, it took two days to finish the competition.

== Competition structure ==
The 2020 Summer Olympics used a four-person heat structure. Four athletes competed at any given time. The best two of each heat continued to the next round. Each heat ran for 20 to 25 minutes, with their top two scores being used.

Only one rider was permitted to ride a wave at any given time, using a common surfing etiquette rule where the surfer who is closest to the peak has right of way. Any interference with the surfer who has right of way could incur a penalty and result in point deductions.

A panel of judges determines each rider's performance from wave to wave, scoring from one to ten with two decimals. e.g. 8.51. Scores are based on the difficulty of manoeuvres performed. This includes speed, power, and flow of each manoeuvre.

== Bid for inclusion ==
On 28 September 2015, surfing was featured on a shortlist along with baseball, softball, skateboarding, karate, and sport climbing to be considered for inclusion in the 2020 Summer Olympics. On 3 August 2016 the International Olympic Committee voted to include all five sports (counting baseball and softball as a single sport) for inclusion in the 2020 Games.

Two major obstacles for surfing to be included in the Olympics for many years was that firstly, it would be difficult to hold surfing events in the event of a landlocked country hosting the Games (compared to sailing which can take place at a lake, surfing requires an ocean current with waves), and secondly, that drowning is one of the major risks in surfing: the IOC was reluctant to take high liabilities in the event of a competitor's death.

== Number of participants ==
20 men and 20 women planned to compete in the 2020 Summer Olympics. However, one of the men, Carlos Muñoz, did not make it in time for his event. Surfing at the Olympics is currently limited to high-performance shortboards only, separated into categories of gender. If surfing is included in upcoming games such as Los Angeles 2028, or Brisbane 2032 other categories such as Longboarding, bodyboarding and SUP may be included.

== Qualification ==
Quota places were allocated to the athletes at the following events:

- Host Country: Japan as host country was allocated 1 place in both men's and women's events. If at least one Japanese surfer had earned a qualification place through other events, the relevant Host Country Place(s) was reallocated to the next highest ranked eligible athlete at the 2020 World Surfing Games.
- 2019 World Surf League Championship Tour – the 10 highest ranked men and 8 highest ranked women were awarded quota places.
- 2019 ISA World Surfing Games – the top finishers from each continent with the exception of the Americas were awarded a quota place.
- 2019 Pan American Games – the top finisher in men's and women's events was awarded a quota place.
- 2021 ISA World Surfing Games – the top 4 men and 6 women were awarded quota places. If a NOC or National Olympic Committee qualified more than the maximum number of athletes, the 2021 ISA World Surfing Games would prevail and any places earned from 2019 were reawarded to the next highest finishing athlete(s).

There was a maximum of 2 men and 2 women per NOC.

== Timeline ==
Event	Places (Men)	Places (Women)	Date	Venue
Host Country	1	1		
2019 Pan American Games	1	1	26 July – 11 August 2019	(Peru) Lima
2019 World Surf League	10	8	April – December 2019	various
2019 ISA World Surfing Games	4	4	7–15 September 2019	(Japan) Miyazaki
2021 ISA World Surfing Games	4	6	29 May – 6 June 2021	El Salvador
Re-allocation of unused quotas	–	–	TBD 2020–21	N/A

== Competition schedule ==
H	Heats	QF	Quarter-Finals	SF	Semi-Finals	F	Finals

Schedule
Date	25 Jul		26 Jul	27 Jul		
Men's	R1	R2	R3	QF	SF	F
Women's	R1	R2	R3	QF	SF	F

Competition took place over 4 days between 25 July and 1 August, subject to wave conditions.

Finals were advanced from 28 July to 27 July, to take advantage of waves caused by Tropical Storm Nepartak.

== Medal summary ==
=== Medal table ===
* Host nation (Japan)

Rank	NOC	Gold	Silver	Bronze	Total
1	Brazil	1	0	0	1
1	United States	1	0	0	1
3	Japan*	0	1	1	2
4	South Africa	0	1	0	1
5	Australia	0	0	1	1
Totals (5 entries)		2	2	2	6

=== Events ===
Event	Gold	Silver	Bronze
Men's shortboard	Ítalo Ferreira; Brazil	Kanoa Igarashi; Japan	Owen Wright; Australia
Women's shortboard	Carissa Moore; United States	Bianca Buitendag; South Africa	Amuro Tsuzuki; Japan

== See also ==
- Surfing at the 2019 Pan American Games
