= Leon Glatzer =

German surfer

Personal information
- Nationality: Germany
- Born: 28 February 1997 (age 28); Maui, Hawaii, U.S.

Sport
- Sport: Surfing

Leon Glatzer (born 28 February 1997) is an American-born German surfer. He competed in the 2020 Summer Olympics.

Glatzer was born on the Hawaiian island of Maui to German parents, but he and his family moved to the Costa Rican beachside town of Pavones, where he grew up.
