= 2019 ISA World Surfing Games =

International Surfer Games

- Venue: Kisakihama Beach
- Location: Miyazaki, Japan
- Date: 7–15 September 2019
- Competitors: 240 from 55 nations
- Website: 2019 ISA World Surfing Games

Champions
- Men: (Brazil) Italo Ferreira
- Women: (Peru) Sofía Mulánovich
- Team: Brazil

The 2019 ISA World Surfing Games took place at Kisakihama Beach in Miyazaki, Japan, from 7 to 15 September 2019. The event was organised by the International Surfing Association (ISA).

== Medal summary ==
=== Medallists ===
Event	Gold	Silver	Bronze
Men	Italo Ferreira; Brazil	Kolohe Andino; United States	Gabriel Medina; Brazil
Women	Sofía Mulánovich; Peru	Silvana Lima; Brazil	Bianca Buitendag; South Africa
Team Points	Brazil; Italo Ferreira; Gabriel Medina; Filipe Toledo; Tainá Hinckel; Silvana Lima; Tatiana Weston-Webb	United States; Kolohe Andino; Conner Coffin; Kelly Slater; Courtney Conlogue; Caroline Marks; Carissa Moore	Japan; Kanoa Igarashi; Shun Murakami; Hiroto Ohhara; Mahina Maeda; Shino Matsuda; Sara Wakita
Aloha Cup	Australia	South Africa	United States

- Standings after the event

=== Medal table ===
* Host nation (Japan)

Rank	Nation	Gold	Silver	Bronze	Total
1	Brazil (BRA)	2	1	1	4
2	Australia (AUS)	1	0	0	1
2	Peru (PER)	1	0	0	1
4	United States (USA)	0	2	1	3
5	South Africa (RSA)	0	1	1	2
6	Japan (JPN)*	0	0	1	1
Totals (6 entries)		4	4	4	12

== Olympic qualification ==
The event contributed towards qualification for the 2020 Olympics in Tokyo, where surfing will make its debut as an Olympic sport. In both the men's and women's competitions, the highest-placed eligible athlete from each of Africa, Asia, Europe and Oceania gained provisional qualification for the 2020 Olympics. The Pan American Games provided the continental qualification places for the Americas.

Qualified athletes

Men

- Ramzi Boukhiam (MAR)
- Rio Waida (INA)
- Frederico Morais (POR)
- Billy Stairmand (NZL)

Women

- Bianca Buitendag (RSA)
- Sofía Mulánovich (PER)
- Anat Lelior (ISR)
- Ella Williams (NZL)

== See also ==
- 2019 World Surf League
