= Manuel Selman =

Chilean surfer

Personal information
- Nationality: Chile
- Born: 14 March 1989 (age 36); Reñaca, Chile

Sport
- Sport: Surfing

Manuel Selman (born 14 March 1989) is a Chilean surfer. He competed in the 2020 Summer Olympics.
