= Hiroto Ohhara =

Japanese surfer (born 1996)

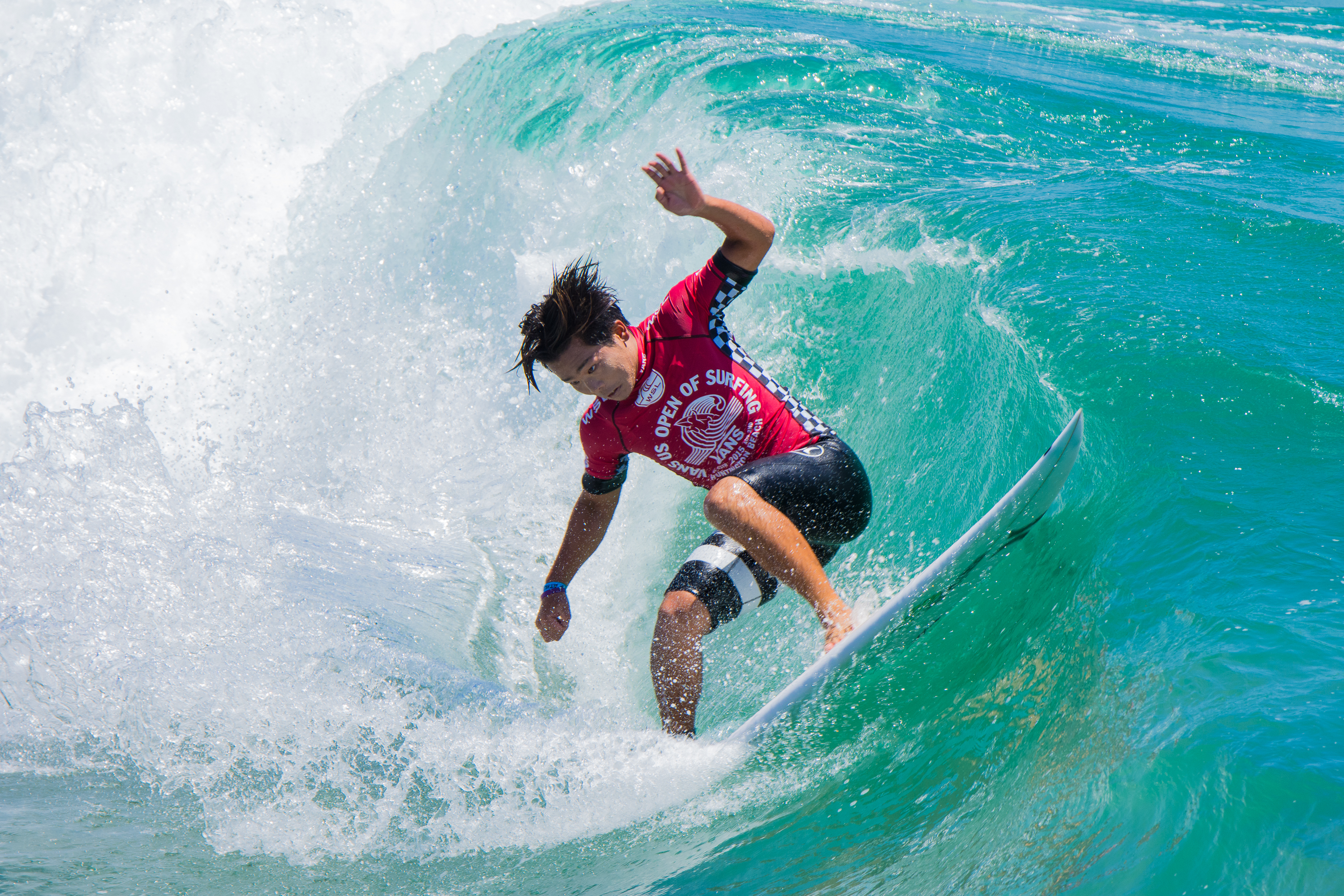
- Hiroto Ohhara,2015

Personal information
- Born: 14 November 1996 (age 29) Chiba, Japan
- Height: 1.62 m (5 ft 4 in)
- Weight: 62 kg (137 lb)

Surfing career
- Sport: Surfing
- Major achievements: 1x US Open of Surfing champion (2015)

Surfing specifications
- Stance: Regular
Medal record
Surfing
Representing Japan
ISA World Surfing Games
Gold medal – first place	2018 Tahara	Team
Silver medal – second place	2021 Surf City	Team
Bronze medal – third place	2019 Miyazaki	Team
World Junior Championships
Bronze medal – third place	2013 Florianópolis	Shortboard

Hiroto Ohhara (大原洋人, Ōhara Hiroto, born 14 November 1996 in Chiba) is a Japanese surfer. He placed 4th overall at the 2021 ISA World Surfing Games, earning qualification for the 2020 Summer Olympics. He competed in the men's shortboard event at the Olympics, where he was eliminated in the quarterfinals by eventual champion Ítalo Ferreira of Brazil.
