= 2022 Pan American Surf Games =

Pan American Surf Games Panama 2022
- Host city: Pedasí
- Country: Panama
- Organisers: Pan American Surf Association; Asociación Panameña de Surf
- Edition: 15th
- Nations: 17
- Athletes: 234
- Sport: Surfing
- Events: 8 (4 men and 4 women)
- Dates: 7–13 August
- Opened by: Miguel Batista (Mayor of Pedasí)
- Main venue: Playa Venao
- Website: Panama 2022

The 2022 Pan American Surf Games, also known as PASA Games 2022, was the fifteenth edition of the Pan American Surf Games the main competition organized by the Pan American Surf Association. It was held at Playa Venao in Pedasí District, Panama from 7 to 13 August 2022.

234 athletes from 17 national teams competes in 8 surfing events; comprising Open (shortboard), Longboard, SUP surf and SUP race each for men and women.

The competition served to seed the surfers and teams in the 2023 Pan American Surf Games, which in turn will serve as qualifier for the 2023 Pan American Games.

Brazil won the competition with a total of 15,195 points and 6 out of the 8 gold medals at stake. The defending champions Peru finished second with 12,017 points and 1 gold medal. Argentina (11,055 points and 1 gold medal) and Mexico (9,285 points) were third and fourth respectively.

== Schedule ==
The games were held over a 7-day period, from 7 to 13 August. The opening ceremony took place on 7 August, with the competitions starting on 8 August.

R1	Round 1	R2	Round 2	QF	Quarter-finals	SF	Semi-finals	F	Final

Event↓/Date →	Mon 8		Tue 9		Wed 10	Thu 11	Fri 12		Sat 13	
Men's Open					R1		R2	QF	SF	F
Men's Longboard			R1	QF		SF	F			
Men's SUP surf	R1	QF	SF			F				
Men's SUP race					F					
Women's Open						R1	R2	QF	SF	F
Women's Longboard			R1	QF		SF	F			
Women's SUP surf	R1	QF	SF			F				
Women's SUP race					F					

== Participating nations ==
17 out of the 26 national associations affiliated to Pan American Surf Association entered the competition. Each nation was able to enter a maximum of 20 surfers (10 men and 10 women), with up to 4 surfers per gender in the Open events and up to 2 surfers per gender in each Longboard, SUP surf and SUP race events. The number of surfers per national team (if given) is shown in brackets.

- Argentina (18)
- Brazil (19)
- Chile (13)
- Colombia (9)
- Costa Rica (12)
- Dominican Republic (3)
- Ecuador (13)
- El Salvador (4)
- Guatemala (5)
- Jamaica (5)
- Mexico (18)
- Nicaragua (2)
- Panama (18)
- Peru (19)
- Puerto Rico (19)
- Uruguay (11)
- Venezuela (14)

== Medal table ==
* Host nation (Panama)

Rank	Nation	Gold	Silver	Bronze	Total
1	Brazil	6	4	1	11
2	Peru	1	1	3	5
3	Argentina	1	1	2	4
4	Mexico	0	1	0	1
4	Panama*	0	1	0	1
6	Ecuador	0	0	1	1
6	Uruguay	0	0	1	1
Totals (7 entries)		8	8	8	24

== Results ==
=== Men's events ===
Event	Gold		Silver		Bronze		Copper	
Open	Mateus Sena; Brazil	13.76 pts	Jean González; Panama	13.40 pts	Lucca Mesinas; Peru	13.37 pts	Miguel Tudela; Peru	12.03 pts
Longboard	Jefson Silva; Brazil	13.26 pts	Rodrigo Sphaier; Brazil	12.20 pts	Nacho Pignataro; Uruguay	9.97 pts	Julian Schweizer; Uruguay	9.27 pts
SUP surf	Luiz Diniz; Brazil	16.17 pts	Felipe Rodríguez; Mexico	12.37 pts	Tamil Martino; Peru	12.00 pts	Leonardo Gimenes; Brazil	10.64 pts
SUP race	Itzel Delgado; Peru	37:36.99	David Leão; Brazil	37:38.30	Franco Fachin; Argentina	38:31.48	Omelv García; Puerto Rico	39:06.91

=== Women's events ===
Event	Gold		Silver		Bronze		Copper	
Open	Sophia Medina; Brazil	12.57 pts	Laura Raupp; Brazil	12.07 pts	Dominic Barona; Ecuador	10.70 pts	Daniella Rosas; Peru	10.03 pts
Longboard	Chloé Calmon; Brazil	15.33 pts	Atalanta Batista; Brazil	9.73 pts	Camila Kaspar; Peru	7.67 pts	Coco Bonilla; Mexico	7.23 pts
SUP surf	Lucía Cosoleto; Argentina	13.00 pts	Vania Torres; Peru	11.40 pts	Aline Adisaka; Brazil	7.10 pts	Gabriela Sztamfater; Brazil	5.87 pts
SUP race	Lena Guimarães; Brazil	42:12.04	Juliana González; Argentina	42:28.74	Natalia de la Lama; Argentina	42:38.83	Aline Adisaka; Brazil	42:55.30

=== Final ranking per teams ===
The final ranking per teams was drawn up by adding each surfer's individual points earning in the events in which they competed. Surfers obtained points according to the final position they occupied in each event. In Open, Longboard and SUP surf events, the surfers eliminated before the final occupied a certain position, as follows:

- Eliminated in round 1 (Open events): 33th place (3rd place of each heat) and 49th place (4th place of each heat)
- Eliminated in round 1 (Longboard and SUP surf) and round 2 (Open): 17th place (3rd place of each heat) and 25th place (4th place of each heat)
- Eliminated in quarter-finals: 9th place (3rd place of each heat) and 13th place (4th place of each heat)
- Eliminated in semi-finals: 5th place (3rd place of each heat) and 7th place (4th place of each heat)

Non-initiators and non-finishers surfers received zero points. Points awarded according to the position were as follows:

1st place, gold medalist(s)	2nd place, silver medalist(s)	3rd place, bronze medalist(s)	4	5	6	7	8	9	10	11	12	13	14	15	16	17	18	19	20	21	25	33	48
1000	860	730	670	610	583	555	528	500	488	475	462	450	438	425	413	400	395	390	385	380	360	320	240

The first place of the final ranking per teams was declared as the champion team of the 2022 Pan American Surf Games.

Rank	Team	MO1	MO2	MO3	MO4	WO1	WO2	WO3	WO4	ML1	ML2	WL1	WL2	MSS1	MSS2	WSS1	WSS2	MSR1	MSR2	WSR1	WSR2	Total
1st place, gold medalist(s)	Brazil	1000	555	500	500	1000	860	450	400	1000	860	1000	860	1000	670	730	670	860	610	1000	670	15195
2nd place, silver medalist(s)	Peru	730	670	400	360	670	610	610	555	610	555	730	610	730	450	860	450	1000	400	555	462	12017
3rd place, bronze medalist(s)	Argentina	610	555	320	320	555	450	400	360	500	500	610	390	555	500	1000	610	730	500	860	730	11055
4	Mexico	400	400	320	240	450	400	400	360	500	450	670	450	860	500	610	450	462	425	488	450	9285
5	Puerto Rico	320	320	320	320	500	400	320	320	400	400	500	500	610	610	555	500	670	583	583	438	9169
6	Panama	860	610	500	320	400	360	360	240	400	400	390	390	450	390	450	390	528	438	610	425	8911
7	Ecuador	450	400	360	320	730	360	320	320	400	360	555	450	450	450	555	500	413	—	500	475	8368
8	Venezuela	450	400	360	360	500	360	360	320	400	400	500	450	500	450	500	450	475	390	528	413	8566
9	Chile	450	400	400	360	500	500	320	320	555	450	555	450	555	390	500	—	395	385	0	0	7485
10	Uruguay	360	240	240	240	400	320	320	320	730	670	450	390	390	390	450	450	488	0	0	0	6848
11	Costa Rica	450	400	360	320	450	400	320	320	610	400	450	390	450	—	—	—	380	—	—	—	5700
12	Colombia	320	320	240	—	320	320	—	—	450	450	500	—	500	390	—	—	555	450	—	—	4815
13	Guatemala	320	320	240	—	320	240	—	—	360	—	—	—	—	—	—	—	—	—	—	—	1800
14	Dominican Republic	360	320	—	—	320	—	—	—	360	360	—	—	—	—	—	—	—	—	—	—	1720
15	El Salvador	500	240	240	—	—	—	—	—	500	—	—	—	—	—	—	—	—	—	—	—	1480
16	Jamaica	320	240	240	—	240	240	—	—	—	—	—	—	—	—	—	—	—	—	—	—	1280
17	Nicaragua	240	—	—	—	360	—	—	—	—	—	—	—	—	—	—	—	—	—	—	—	600

Note: "—" Denotes that there were no competitors for that position
