= 2022 Pan American Surf Games – Women's Open =

Women's Open at the 2022 Pan American Surf Games
- Venue: Playa Venao
- Dates: 11–13 August 2022
- Winning score: 12.57 pts

Medalists
gold medal	Sophia Medina	Brazil
silver medal	Laura Raupp	Brazil
bronze medal	Dominic Barona	Ecuador

The women's open (shortboard) competition at the 2022 Pan American Surf Games was held at Playa Venao in Pedasí District, Panama from 11 to 13 August 2022.

== Competition format ==
The competition consists of five rounds:

- Round 1: 16 heats, 4 heats of 4 surfers and 12 of 3. The top 2 in each heat (32 total) advanced to round 2.
- Round 2: 8 heats of 4 surfers each; the top 2 in each heat (16 total) advanced to quarter-finals.
- Quarter-finals: 4 heats of 4 surfers each; the top 2 in each heat (8 total) advanced to semi-finals.
- Semi-finals: 2 heats of 4 surfers each; the top 2 in each heat (4 total) advanced to the final.
- Final: 1 heat of 4 surfers.

The length of each heat was 20 minutes. Scoring for each wave taken by the surfers is an average of 5 scores given by 5 judges, ranging from 0 to 10 points. The best two waves for each surfer counting and are added to obtain the total score.

== Results ==
=== Round 1 ===
==== Heat 1 ====
Rank	Surfer	Nation	Waves				Total score	Notes
Rank	Surfer	Nation	1	2	3	4	Total score	Notes
1	Melanie Giunta	Peru	2.50	6.83	6.10		12.93	R2
2	Estela López	Chile	4.67	0.83	2.80	4.00	8.67	R2
3	Anabella López	Puerto Rico	2.63	1.83	1.33		4.46	E

==== Heat 2 ====
Rank	Surfer	Nation	Waves						Total score	Notes
Rank	Surfer	Nation	1	2	3	4	5	6	Total score	Notes
1	Rachel Agüero	Costa Rica	3.83	7.67	6.67	4.27			14.34	R2
2	Candelaria Resano	Nicaragua	2.40	2.90	4.17	3.37	3.10		7.54	R2
3	Susana Berrezueta	Ecuador	0.90	2.83	0.80	1.37	4.33	1.50	7.16	E
4	Karin Lone Zarceño	Guatemala	1.33	1.27	0.97				2.60	E

==== Heat 3 ====
Rank	Surfer	Nation	Waves						Total score	Notes
Rank	Surfer	Nation	1	2	3	4	5	6	Total score	Notes
1	Coco Cianciarulo	Argentina	2.67	2.07	7.50	2.63	2.83	5.67	13.17	R2
2	Regina Pioli	Mexico	5.00	2.70					7.70	R2
3	Tiziana Billy Prem	Guatemala	1.00	4.00	0.00*	0.00 P2	0.60		4.00	E

==== Heat 4 ====
Rank	Surfer	Nation	Waves							Total score	Notes
Rank	Surfer	Nation	1	2	3	4	5	6	7	Total score	Notes
1	Taina Hunckel	Brazil	1.50	4.67	5.17	1.50	4.43	8.17	8.17	16.34	R2
2	Luna Marcano	Venezuela	2.17	1.40	3.17	0.50	2.37			5.54	R2
3	Angelina Decesare	Colombia	3.00	1.73	0.97					4.73	E

==== Heat 5 ====
Rank	Surfer	Nation	Waves						Total score	Notes
Rank	Surfer	Nation	1	2	3	4	5	6	Total score	Notes
1	Siphia Medina	Brazil	7.33	6.93	8.67	2.20			16.00	R2
2	Delfina Morosini	Uruguay	8.00	2.83	3.10	3.30			11.30	R2
3	Rosaura Álvarez	Venezuela	4.67	3.67	2.23	2.33	0.83	4.03	8.70	E

==== Heat 6 ====
Rank	Surfer	Nation	Waves								Total score	Notes
Rank	Surfer	Nation	1	2	3	4	5	6	7	8	Total score	Notes
1	Ana Laura González	Mexico	0.50	4.33	2.97	4.93	1.13	4.00			9.26	R2
2	Lucía Indurain	Argentina	3.83	2.53	3.10	5.33	1.57	3.40	0.87	0.87	9.16	R2
3	Marcela Machado	Uruguay	1.83	2.23	4.03	4.73	3.83	2.43			8.76	E

==== Heat 7 ====
Rank	Surfer	Nation	Waves							Total score	Notes
Rank	Surfer	Nation	1	2	3	4	5	6	7	Total score	Notes
1	Dominic Barona	Ecuador	0.97	4.10	6.67	5.50	6.03	0.50	3.77	12-70	R2
2	Andrea Vlieg	Panama	2.00	2.23	1.47	2.90				5.13	R2
3	Lía Díaz	Costa Rica	0.77	2.67	2.43	1.50	1.97			5.10	E
4	Evelyn Chávez	Panama	1.20							1.20	E

==== Heat 8 ====
Rank	Surfer	Nation	Waves								Total score	Notes
Rank	Surfer	Nation	1	2	3	4	5	6	7	8	Total score	Notes
1	Havanna Cabrero	Puerto Rico	6.00	4.17	1.87	0.50	2.83	4.63	8.17	5.97	14.17	R2
2	Sol Aguirre	Peru	3.33	4.10	7.33						11.43	R2
3	Sofía Driscol	Chile	2.73	3.13	2.70	1.00					5.86	E

==== Heat 9 ====
Rank	Surfer	Nation	Waves					Total score	Notes
Rank	Surfer	Nation	1	2	3	4	5	Total score	Notes
1	Daniella Rosas	Peru	7.00	6.17	7.10	9.33		16.43	R2
2	Mia Calderón	Puerto Rico	4.83	3.67	1.40	4.37	5.97	10.80	R2
3	Natalia Escobar	Chile	0.67	4.50	3.27	1.07		7.77	E

==== Heat 10 ====
Rank	Surfer	Nation	Waves					Total score	Notes
Rank	Surfer	Nation	1	2	3	4	5	Total score	Notes
1	Erika Berra	Costa Rica	1.30	0.80	4.17	0.30	1.00	5.47	R2
2	Isabella Goodwin	Panama	1.07	2.83	2.13	0.33	1.00	4.96	R2
3	Genesis Borja	Ecuador	1.37	0.87	1.87	0.33	0.97	3.24	E
4	Imani Wilmot	Jamaica	0.57	0.50				1.07	E

==== Heat 11 ====
Rank	Surfer	Nation	Waves									Total score	Notes
Rank	Surfer	Nation	1	2	3	4	5	6	7	8	9	Total score	Notes
1	Laura Raupp	Brazil	3.33	6.50	0.47	5.73	3.57	4.65	8.17			14.67	R2
2	Rosanni Álvarez	Venezuela	1.83	0.50	3.83	1.03	3.63	4.27	2.47	4.00	2.03	8.27	R2
3	Feliz Astacio	Dominican Republic	2.07	1.23	1.77	1.90	2.30	2.87				5.17	E

==== Heat 12 ====
Rank	Surfer	Nation	Waves							Total score	Notes
Rank	Surfer	Nation	1	2	3	4	5	6	7	Total score	Notes
1	Josefina Ane	Argentina	0.83	5.50	2.07	4.47	6.67	2.20		12.17	R2
2	Summer Sívori	Mexico	1.13	4.17	2.63	0.50	2.30	0.53	0.77	6.80	R2
3	Sofia Alfonso	Uruguay	2.17	1.30	2.23	0.20	0.80			4.40	E

==== Heat 13 ====
Rank	Surfer	Nation	Waves								Total score	Notes
Rank	Surfer	Nation	1	2	3	4	5	6	7	8	Total score	Notes
1	Valeria Ojeda	Venezuela	3.00	4.50	1.13	6.10					10.60	R2
2	Mariana Areno	Brazil	5.17	3.93	0.90	1.17	3.27				9.10	R2
3	Margarita Conde	Colombia	2.60	2.43	2.90	2.20	2.73	2.90	3.27	0.57	6.17	E

==== Heat 14 ====
Rank	Surfer	Nation	Waves						Total score	Notes
Rank	Surfer	Nation	1	2	3	4	5	6	Total score	Notes
1	Ornella Pellizari	Argentina	5.83	3.67	6.50	1.27	3.67	4.70	12.33	R2
2	Shelby Detmers	Mexico	3.57	4.67	3.30	4.07	1.00	1.50	8.74	R2
3	Celia Barboza	Uruguay	3.17	1.83	3.40	0.63			6.57	E

==== Heat 15 ====
Rank	Surfer	Nation	Waves											Total score	Notes
Rank	Surfer	Nation	1	2	3	4	5	6	7	8	9	10	11	Total score	Notes
1	Wendy Velázquez	Ecuador	1.57	2.67	6.33	2.93	0.37	0.60	0.50	5.67	4.27	1.47	0.80	12.00	R2
2	Samanta Alonso	Panama	4.33	3.67	0.83	3.47	1.63	0.58	4.47	1.57	0.96	4.00		8.80	R2
3	Kristel Stanley	Costa Rica	0.50	1.27	1.00	1.73	1.90							3.63	E
4	Zoe Bain	Jamaica	0.20	1.00	0.43	1.07	1.37	1.03						2.44	E

==== Heat 16 ====
Rank	Surfer	Nation	Waves					Total score	Notes
Rank	Surfer	Nation	1	2	3	4	5	Total score	Notes
1	Arena Rodríguez	Peru	5.00	6.67	4.20	4.87	4.03	11.67	R2
2	Lorena Fica	Chile	2.67	2.63	4.30	3.87		8.17	R2
3	Jolari Carrera	Puerto Rico	2.83	3.77	3.50	1.40	4.07	7.84	E

=== Round 2 ===
==== Heat 17 ====
Rank	Surfer	Nation	Waves							Total score	Notes
Rank	Surfer	Nation	1	2	3	4	5	6	7	Total score	Notes
1	Melanie Giunta	Peru	4.33	4.50	2.23	3.57	0.67	2.80	4.73	9.23	QF
2	Rachel Agüero	Costa Rica	3.00	3.20	3.93	0.33	2.57	2.43		7.13	QF
3	Regina Pioli	Mexico	1.00	0.67	1.90	0.93	2.30	3.23		5.53	E
4	Luna Marcano	Venezuela	2.33	1.25	1.17	0.70	1.80	1.00	1.20	4.13	E

==== Heat 18 ====
Rank	Surfer	Nation	Waves							Total score	Notes
Rank	Surfer	Nation	1	2	3	4	5	6	7	Total score	Notes
1	Tainá Hynckel	Brazil	6.17	4.83	4.60	5.83				12.00	QF
2	Estela López	Chile	1.50	0.77	0.67	4.57	4.27	3.17		8.84	QF
3	Coco Cianciarulo	Argentina	3.43	3.93	3.40	1.30				7.36	E
4	Candelaria Resano	Nicaragua	2.43	3.50	2.90	2.27	0.53	0.53	2.63	6.40	E

==== Heat 19 ====
Rank	Surfer	Nation	Waves								Total score	Notes
Rank	Surfer	Nation	1	2	3	4	5	6	7	8	Total score	Notes
1	Sophia Medina	Brazil	0.50	5.50	4.17	2.63	7.50	4.33	1.13	6.40	13.90	QF
2	Sol Aguirre	Peru	4.00	3.90	6.23	4.57	1.37				10.80	QF
3	Ana Laura González	Mexico	2.50	3.20	3.47	1.07					6.67	E
4	Andrea Vlieg	Panama	2.17	2.63	1.60	2.23					4.86	E

==== Heat 20 ====
Rank	Surfer	Nation	Waves							Total score	Notes
Rank	Surfer	Nation	1	2	3	4	5	6	7	Total score	Notes
1	Dominic Barona	Ecuador	6.33	2.87	5.93	1.23	3.60			12.26	QF
2	Havanna Cabrero	Puerto Rico	1.50	3.33	2.03	4.07	3.27	5.17	3.87	9.24	QF
3	Delfina Morosini	Uruguay	2.67	3.90	4.57	1.23	3.73	1.17	1.33	8.47	E
4	Lucía Indurain	Argentina	1.13	2.77	4.10					6.87	E

==== Heat 21 ====
Rank	Surfer	Nation	Waves					Total score	Notes
Rank	Surfer	Nation	1	2	3	4	5	Total score	Notes
1	Daniella Rosas	Peru	7.00	2.93	5.67	8.00	4.70	15.00	QF
2	Rosanni Álvarez	Venezuela	4.17	2.00	3.37	4.33		8.50	QF
3	Erika Berra	Costa Rica	1.00	2.50	1.80	5.17	0.70	7.67	E
4	Summer Sívori	Mexico	2.07	0.83	0.97	2.27		4.34	E

==== Heat 22 ====
Rank	Surfer	Nation	Waves								Total score	Notes
Rank	Surfer	Nation	1	2	3	4	5	6	7	8	Total score	Notes
1	Laura Raupp	Brazil	5.17	4.23	0.50	8.17	7.27	1.93			15.44	QF
2	Josefina Ane	Argentina	3.33	3.23	0.83	4.53	0.67				7.86	QF
3	Mia Calderón	Puerto Rico	2.33	3.27	3.07	4.13	1.00	3.53			7.66	E
4	Isabella Goodwin	Panama	2.40	1.57	3.07	2.17	3.90	1.27	2.97	1.27	6.27	E

==== Heat 23 ====
Rank	Surfer	Nation	Waves								Total score	Notes
Rank	Surfer	Nation	1	2	3	4	5	6	7	8	Total score	Notes
1	Ornella Pellizari	Argentina	2.00	3.60	5.43	6.10	8.33				14.43	QF
2	Lorena Fica	Chile	2.33	3.70	3.47	2.30	4.83	1.23			8.53	QF
3	Samanta Alonso	Panama	4.33	3.63	0.50	2.33	2.83	3.37	0.50	2.80	7.96	E
4	Valeria Ojeda	Venezuela	4.00	3.93	0.73	0.77					7.93	E

==== Heat 24 ====
Rank	Surfer	Nation	Waves								Total score	Notes
Rank	Surfer	Nation	1	2	3	4	5	6	7	8	Total score	Notes
1	Arena Rodríguez	Peru	4.50	4.23	5.03	3.50	0.50	6.67	3.53		11.70	QF
2	Shelby Detmers	Mexico	1.33	0.20	5.83	2.53	2.93	5.03	4.10		10.86	QF
3	Mariana Areno	Brazil	0.57	4.77	3.00	2.03	2.83	2.23			7.77	E
4	Wendy Velázquez	Ecuador	3.00	1.07	1.00	1.00	3.07	3.60	0.77	1.00	6.67	E

=== Quarter-finals ===
==== Heat 25 ====
Rank	Surfer	Nation	Waves							Total score	Notes
Rank	Surfer	Nation	1	2	3	4	5	6	7	Total score	Notes
1	Sol Aguirre	Peru	3.10	5.33	5.50	2.23	7.33			10.33	SF
2	Melanie Giunta	Peru	2.13	0.77	5.17	4.07	2.50	3.17		9.24	SF
3	Havanna Cabrero	Puerto Rico	1.83	4.33	0.50	3.83	2.40	3.17	2.87	8.16	E
4	Tainá Hynckel	Brazil	1.57	2.80	0.73	2.23				5.03	E

==== Heat 26 ====
Rank	Surfer	Nation	Waves								Total score	Notes
Rank	Surfer	Nation	1	2	3	4	5	6	7	8	Total score	Notes
1	Dominic Barona	Ecuador	8.33	3.00	1.83	5.00	0.30	3.80	0.30	3.77	13.33	SF
2	Sophia Medina	Brazil	5.00	1.13	4.17	4.40	2.67	4.20			9.40	SF
3	Estela López	Chile	2.37	2.60	3.17	3.23					6.40	E
4	Rachel Agüero	Costa Rica	0.83	2.20	0.50	3.23					5.43	E

==== Heat 27 ====
Rank	Surfer	Nation	Waves						Total score	Notes
Rank	Surfer	Nation	1	2	3	4	5	6	Total score	Notes
1	Daniella Rosas	Peru	5.17	4.30	6.83	0.83			12.00	SF
2	Laura Raupp	Brazil	0.50	5.00	4.10	0.50	3.93		9.10	SF
3	Lorena Fica	Chile	3.20	3.60	2.43	3.97	0.90		7.57	E
4	Shelby Detmers	Mexico	3.50	3.63	2.30	3.73	1.00	2.27	7.36	E

==== Heat 28 ====
Rank	Surfer	Nation	Waves					Total score	Notes
Rank	Surfer	Nation	1	2	3	4	5	Total score	Notes
1	Arena Rodríguez	Peru	4.00	5.50	5.87	1.03		11.37	SF
2	Ornella Pellizari	Argentina	2.50	2.77	2.17	3.13	5.57	8.70	SF
3	Rosanni Álvarez	Venezuela	2.97	3.60	4.57	3.93		8.50	E
4	Josefina Ane	Argentina	1.97	0.93	4.37	0.73	0.63	6.34	E

=== Semi-finals ===
==== Heat 29 ====
Rank	Surfer	Nation	Waves								Total score	Notes
Rank	Surfer	Nation	1	2	3	4	5	6	7	8	Total score	Notes
1	Laura Raupp	Brazil	2.67	4.50	0.67	2.63	5.10	2.90	2.90		9.60	F
2	Dominic Barona	Ecuador	5.33	3.33	3.77	0.77	3.13				9.10	F
3	Sol Aguirre	Peru	3.67	3.43	1.27	1.23	4.57	3.53			8.24	E
4	Ornella Pellizari	Argentina	1.17	3.37	3.83	0.57	0.73	2.40	2.47	1.23	7.20	E

==== Heat 30 ====
Rank	Surfer	Nation	Waves									Total score	Notes
Rank	Surfer	Nation	1	2	3	4	5	6	7	8	9	Total score	Notes
1	Sophia Medina	Brazil	0.33	0.60	0.57	5.33	0.20	5.50	6.00	3.83	6.23	11.33	F
2	Daniella Rosas	Peru	0.43	0.87	4.43	1.23	5.30	5.63	0.83	2.37	2.23	10.93	F
3	Melanie Giunta	Peru	3.33	3.10	5.40	1.23	4.57	2.53				9.97	E
4	Arena Rodríguez	Peru	3.33	3.83	1.00	1.00	1.70	3.77	0.73			7.60	E

=== Final ===
==== Heat 31 ====
Rank	Surfer	Nation	Waves									Total score	Notes
Rank	Surfer	Nation	1	2	3	4	5	6	7	8	9	Total score	Notes
1st place, gold medalist(s)	Sophia Medina	Brazil	8.17	0.77	4.33	3.40	1.27	4.40	4.23	1.44	2.40	12.57	
2nd place, silver medalist(s)	Laura Raupp	Brazil	4.17	4.53	1.10	1.27	0.90	7.17	4.83	0.83	4.90	12.07	
3rd place, bronze medalist(s)	Dominic Barona	Ecuador	1.13	5.83	4.87	1.00						10.70	
4	Daniella Rosas	Peru	0.97	4.93	5.10							10.03	
