= 2022 Pan American Surf Games – Men's Open =

Men's Open at the 2022 Pan American Surf Games
- Venue: Playa Venao
- Dates: 10–13 August 2022
- Winning score: 13.76 pts

Medalists
gold medal	Mateus Sena	Brazil
silver medal	Jean González	Panama
bronze medal	Lucca Mesinas	Peru

The men's open (shortboard) competition at the 2022 Pan American Surf Games was held at Playa Venao in Pedasí District, Panama from 10 to 13 August 2022.

== Competition format ==
The competition consisted of five rounds:

- Round 1: 16 heats, 11 heats of 4 surfers and 5 of 3. The top 2 in each heat (32 total) advanced to round 2.
- Round 2: 8 heats of 4 surfers each; the top 2 in each heat (16 total) advanced to quarter-finals.
- Quarter-finals: 4 heats of 4 surfers each; the top 2 in each heat (8 total) advanced to semi-finals.
- Semi-finals: 2 heats of 4 surfers each; the top 2 in each heat (4 total) advanced to the final.
- Final: 1 heat of 4 surfers.

The length of each heat was 20 minutes. Scoring for each wave taken by the surfers is an average of 5 scores given by 5 judges, ranging from 0 to 10 points. The best two waves for each surfer counting and are added to obtain the total score.

== Results ==
=== Round 1 ===
==== Heat 1 ====
Rank	Surfer	Nation	Waves					Total score	Notes
Rank	Surfer	Nation	1	2	3	4	5	Total score	Notes
1	Joaquín del Castillo	Peru	5.00	7.33	7.83	5.23		15.16	R2
2	Manuel Selman	Chile	6.00	4.10	0.80	5.33		11.33	R2
3	Ricardo Delgado	Puerto Rico	1.00	3.73	5.23	3.93	4.80	10.03	E

==== Heat 2 ====
Rank	Surfer	Nation	Waves								Total score	Notes
Rank	Surfer	Nation	1	2	3	4	5	6	7	8	Total score	Notes
1	Isauro Elizondo	Panama	3.33	5.83	4.83	1.23	4.03	4.20	5.27		11.10	R2
2	Roberto Rodríguez	Ecuador	5.17	3.03	4.43	5.37					10.54	R2
3	Oscar Urbina	Costa Rica	4.23	3.93	3.70	1.63	5.37	3.23			9.60	E
4	Lucas Madrid	Uruguay	0.50	2.50	1.10	0.73	4.13	2.13	3.83	3.47	7.96	E

==== Heat 3 ====
Rank	Surfer	Nation	Waves						Total score	Notes
Rank	Surfer	Nation	1	2	3	4	5	6	Total score	Notes
1	Tao Rodríguez	Panama	4.67	6.33	6.60	8.67	1.47		15.27	R2
2	Santiago Muñiz	Argentina	4.93	4.87	3.37	0.60	1.73	4.80	9.80	R2
3	Sebastián Williams	Mexico	3.17	3.63	5.77	3.80			9.57	E
4	Francisco Morosini	Uruguay	3.67	2.00	4.73	4.10			8.83	E

==== Heat 4 ====
Rank	Surfer	Nation	Waves							Total score	Notes
Rank	Surfer	Nation	1	2	3	4	5	6	7	Total score	Notes
1	João Chianca	Brazil	3.17	1.07	4.07	4.40	7.00	1.63	6.23	13.23	R2
2	Franwill Vento	Venezuela	0.73	2.17	3.73	2.87	2.07			6.60	R2
3	Simón Salazar	Colombia	2.80	0.50	2.07	0.77	2.67	3.63		6.43	E

==== Heat 5 ====
Rank	Surfer	Nation	Waves								Total score	Notes
Rank	Surfer	Nation	1	2	3	4	5	6	7	8	Total score	Notes
1	Mateus Sena	Brazil	6.33	3.50	3.40	3.80	5.77	5.30	0.30	7.17	13.50	R2
2	José López	Venezuela	2.17	4.60	3.90	5.40	3.80	4.87			10.27	R2
3	Cristian Padilla	Dominican Republic	4.50	3.53	2.77	2.17	3.13				8.03	E
4	Ronald Hastings	Jamaica	2.13	3.33	0.50	3.00					6.33	E

==== Heat 6 ====
Rank	Surfer	Nation	Waves						Total score	Notes
Rank	Surfer	Nation	1	2	3	4	5	6	Total score	Notes
1	Jhonny Corzo	Mexico	2.00	6.50	5.93	6.60			13.10	R2
2	Saori Pérez	Dominican Republic	3.83	0.50	1.60	3.93	1.83	1.83	7.76	R2
3	Ignacio Gundesen	Argentina	1.10	2.57	0.50	4.67	1.17		7.24	E
4	Ackeam Phillips	Jamaica	1.07	1.80	2.13	0.70	2.87		5.00	E

==== Heat 7 ====
Rank	Surfer	Nation	Waves								Total score	Notes
Rank	Surfer	Nation	1	2	3	4	5	6	7	8	Total score	Notes
1	Alex Suárez	Ecuador	5.50	4.87	4.73	1.20	4.53	6.33	2.70		11.83	R2
2	Tosh Talbot	Costa Rica	4.50	1.03	0.67	2.57	3.80				8.30	R2
3	Carlos Escobar	Guatemala	0.67	2.67	2.67	3.33	2.13	1.23	4.03	2.60	7.36	E
4	Daniel Monterrosa	El Salvador	3.67	1.83	3.27	3.30	2.70				6.97	E

==== Heat 8 ====
Rank	Surfer	Nation	Waves									Total score	Notes
Rank	Surfer	Nation	1	2	3	4	5	6	7	8	9	Total score	Notes
1	Maximiliano Cross	Chile	2.67	4.00	3.40	5.63	0.73	6.27	3.33	4.67	0.93	11.90	R2
2	Miguel Tudela	Peru	5.00	1.93	3.90	4.30	5.20	5.27	5.83	4.43		11.10	R2
3	Dwight Pastrana	Puerto Rico	6.17	3.73	4.90	2.80	0.50					11.07	E

==== Heat 9 ====
Rank	Surfer	Nation	Waves									Total score	Notes
Rank	Surfer	Nation	1	2	3	4	5	6	7	8	9	Total score	Notes
1	Lucca Mesinas	Peru	4.50	5.83	5.67	7.33	0.67	0.80	1.00	1.23	5.40	13.16	R2
2	Gustavo Dvorquez	Chile	5.07	4.60	2.57	1.43						9.67	R2
3	Sage Katz	Puerto Rico	3.17	2.00	2.83							6.00	E

==== Heat 10 ====
Rank	Surfer	Nation	Waves								Total score	Notes
Rank	Surfer	Nation	1	2	3	4	5	6	7	8	Total score	Notes
1	Sebastián Schneider	Costa Rica	4.53	6.17	5.57						11.74	R2
2	Bruce Burgos	Ecuador	3.43	2.70	4.73	1.20	4.47	3.57			9.20	R2
3	Elder Vega	Guatemala	3.60	2.90	2.20	3.63	2.30	1.90	2.10	0.70	7.23	E
4	Erickson Ortiz	El Salvador	2.67	3.70	0.60	0.87	3.07	3.10	1.43		6.80	E

==== Heat 11 ====
Rank	Surfer	Nation	Waves								Total score	Notes
Rank	Surfer	Nation	1	2	3	4	5	6	7	8	Total score	Notes
1	Messias Felix	Brazil	4.83	1.07	5.60	6.50	1.90	4.20	2.67	1.73	12.10	R2
2	Keoni Lasa	Venezuela	6.33	3.50	5.47	0.57	0.83	2.40	3.37	3.03	11.80	R2
3	Elishama Beckford	Jamaica	0.67	5.60	5.90	1.07					11.50	E
4	Carlos Moreno	Colombia	1.13	0.93	2.87	3.50	3.53				7.03	E

==== Heat 12 ====
Rank	Surfer	Nation	Waves									Total score	Notes
Rank	Surfer	Nation	1	2	3	4	5	6	7	8	9	Total score	Notes
1	Tomas López Moreno	Argentina	2.40	4.67	6.60	2.27	4.37	1.20	1.60			11.27	R2
2	Sebastián Olarte	Uruguay	4.83	0.83	2.50	4.53	0.67	2.23	1.30	4.07	5.47	10.30	R2
3	Diego Salgado	Panama	3.33	4.40	1.77	1.87	1.00					7.73	E
4	Osmar Guerrero	Mexico	3.33	1.50	4.27	2.73	1.13	2.87	3.13			7.60	E

==== Heat 13 ====
Rank	Surfer	Nation	Waves									Total score	Notes
Rank	Surfer	Nation	1	2	3	4	5	6	7	8	9	Total score	Notes
1	Deivid Silva	Brazil	4.83	1.00	9.00	10.00	1.33	0.60	1.03			19.00	R2
2	Carlos Pérez	Venezuela	3.67	1.75	3.87	4.20	4.93					9.13	R2
3	Romeo Chávez	Colombia	0.50	3.60	3.57	0.50	1.60	0.77	4.27	4.13	2.33	8.40	E
4	Óscar Guzmán	Nicaragua	2.50	1.17	2.77	3.30	2.57	3.50				6.80	E

==== Heat 14 ====
Rank	Surfer	Nation	Waves										Total score	Notes
Rank	Surfer	Nation	1	2	3	4	5	6	7	8	9	10	Total score	Notes
1	Jean González	Panama	2.33	5.00	1.27	5.43	5.13	3.67					10.56	R2
2	Rey Hernández	Mexico	2.40	2.63	3.93	5.43							9.36	R2
3	Leandro Usuna	Argentina	1.67	3.60	0.43	3.37	0.77	3.70	5.57	2.10	2.37	2.73	9.27	E
4	Martín Ottado	Uruguay	3.67	0.30	1.73	4.23	0.90	0.67	2.00				7.90	E

==== Heat 15 ====
Rank	Surfer	Nation	Waves						Total score	Notes
Rank	Surfer	Nation	1	2	3	4	5	6	Total score	Notes
1	Bryan Pérez	El Salvador	2.50	5.33	6.17	3.77	0.50	4.43	11.50	R2
2	Malakai Martínez	Costa Rica	5.93	4.67	4.33	4.43			10.60	R2
3	Israel Barona	Ecuador	2.00	3.77	2.80	1.17	1.30	1.80	6.57	E
4	José Marroquín	Guatemala	0.57	3.00	2.43	0.97	1.47		5.43	E

==== Heat 16 ====
Rank	Surfer	Nation	Waves									Total score	Notes
Rank	Surfer	Nation	1	2	3	4	5	6	7	8	9	Total score	Notes
1	Roberto Araki	Chile	0.83	7.00	1.13	5.67	4.03	6.33				13.33	R2
2	Tomás Tudela	Peru	2.00	3.83	4.50	0.83	1.03	5.27	6.43	1.03	3.10	11.70	R2
3	Giancarlo Méndez	Puerto Rico	2.93	2.60	0.83	4.23	4.33					8.56	E

=== Round 2 ===
==== Heat 17 ====
Rank	Surfer	Nation	Waves							Total score	Notes
Rank	Surfer	Nation	1	2	3	4	5	6	7	Total score	Notes
1	Santiago Muñiz	Argentina	0.83	4.33	0.93	5.00	6.33	0.87		11.33	QF
2	Isauro Elizondo	Panama	2.83	2.50	4.67	3.83	6.37	3.93		11.04	QF
3	Joaquín del Castillo	Peru	0.53	2.77	2.07	1.30	6.60	4.43		11.03	E
4	Franwill Vento	Venezuela	3.67	0.93	3.60	2.97	4.33	1.00	5.83	10.16	E

==== Heat 18 ====
Rank	Surfer	Nation	Waves									Total score	Notes
Rank	Surfer	Nation	1	2	3	4	5	6	7	8	9	Total score	Notes
1	João Chianca	Brazil	3.83	3.93	4.50	4.70	6.33	7.17	0.43			13.50	QF
2	Tao Rodríguez	Panama	4.67	1.00	0.47	6.17	4.37	3.47	4.73	3.23	3.57	10.90	QF
3	Roberto Rodríguez	Ecuador	0.50	0.87	2.17	0.93	5.40	4.97				10.37	E
4	Manuel Selman	Chile	2.67	4.37	4.07	1.07	0.57	2.97	2.37			8.44	E

==== Heat 19 ====
Rank	Surfer	Nation	Waves								Total score	Notes
Rank	Surfer	Nation	1	2	3	4	5	6	7	8	Total score	Notes
1	Miguel Tudela	Peru	1.17	8.67	4.73	6.33					15.00	QF
2	Mateus Sena	Brazil	1.13	5.17	0.60	5.23	6.03	1.00	1.33		11.26	QF
3	Jhonny Corzo	Mexico	4.83	4.60	2.67	4.33					9.43	E
4	Tosh Talbot	Costa Rica	0.93	1.33	2.60	4.73	0.47	1.07	0.90	1.40	7.33	E

==== Heat 20 ====
Rank	Surfer	Nation	Waves									Total score	Notes
Rank	Surfer	Nation	1	2	3	4	5	6	7	8	9	Total score	Notes
1	Alex Suárez	Ecuador	5.67	6.90	4.13	1.10						12.57	QF
2	José López	Venezuela	4.83	6.00	1.07	1.07	1.00	0.87	5.07			11.07	QF
3	Maximiliano Cross	Chile	3.83	3.50	1.33	1.70	3.70	3.53	5.10	3.43	3.07	8.93	E
4	Saori Pérez	Dominican Republic	0.67	2.70	1.10	3.07	2.87	0.67	2.23	2.87	1.10	5.94	E

==== Heat 21 ====
Rank	Surfer	Nation	Waves								Total score	Notes
Rank	Surfer	Nation	1	2	3	4	5	6	7	8	Total score	Notes
1	Lucca Mesinas	Peru	3.33	4.40	5.60	0.83	5.67				11.27	QF
2	Sebastián Schneider	Costa Rica	6.10	3.77	2.30	1.17	2.37				9.87	QF
3	Keoni Lasa	Venezuela	4.67	3.57	5.17	3.27	2.37				9.84	E
4	Sebastián Olarte	Uruguay	2.27	3.83	2.40	3.50	1.00	1.27	3.17	2.33	7.33	E

==== Heat 22 ====
Rank	Surfer	Nation	Waves									Total score	Notes
Rank	Surfer	Nation	1	2	3	4	5	6	7	8	9	Total score	Notes
1	Messias Felix	Brazil	0.90	3.53	7.17	5.60	0.70	1.27	6.50	7.83	6.20	15.00	QF
2	Tomás López Moreno	Argentina	0.60	2.40	2.40	1.23	5.33	4.70	0.87	5.20		10.53	QF
3	Gustavo Dvorquez	Chile	4.33	3.00	2.97	4.33	4.10	3.13	6.13			10.46	E
4	Bruce Burgos	Ecuador	2.83	1.17	2.30	4.90	2.60	3.13	3.93	4.70	4.60	9.60	E

==== Heat 23 ====
Rank	Surfer	Nation	Waves								Total score	Notes
Rank	Surfer	Nation	1	2	3	4	5	6	7	8	Total score	Notes
1	Jean González	Panama	0.57	8.83	3.10	1.60	7.23				16.06	QF
2	Deivid Silva	Brazil	6.67	7.07							13.74	QF
3	Malakai Martínez	Costa Rica	3.00	0.73	5.57	0.50	7.83	4.50	0.77	1.43	13.40	E
4	Tomás Tudela	Peru	1.00	1.30	2.30	2.67	4.27	0.83	1.63		6.94	E

==== Heat 24 ====
Rank	Surfer	Nation	Waves						Total score	Notes
Rank	Surfer	Nation	1	2	3	4	5	6	Total score	Notes
1	Bryan Pérez	El Salvador	1.00	4.00	0.97	0.80	5.00	5.60	10.60	QF
2	Roberto Araki	Chile	3.50	0.43	0.90	6.00	1.23	0.83	9.50	QF
3	Rey Hernández	Mexico	4.83	3.07	1.03	4.33	3.37	0.27	9.16	E
4	Carlos Pérez	Venezuela	3.33	3.60	2.37	5.10			8.70	E

=== Quarter-finals ===
==== Heat 25 ====
Rank	Surfer	Nation	Waves								Total score	Notes
Rank	Surfer	Nation	1	2	3	4	5	6	7	8	Total score	Notes
1	Mateus Sena	Brazil	7.33	1.00	6.50	7.53	2.80	8.17	7.17	1.77	15.70	SF
2	Santiago Muñiz	Argentina	7.50	5.00	0.73	3.17	7.07	5.60			14.57	SF
3	João Chianca	Brazil	4.53	6.60	4.60	3.50					10.60	E
4	José López	Venezuela	1.83	4.00	4.60	2.13	4.27	4.20			8.87	E

==== Heat 26 ====
Rank	Surfer	Nation	Waves							Total score	Notes
Rank	Surfer	Nation	1	2	3	4	5	6	7	Total score	Notes
1	Tao Rodríguez	Panama	0.50	7.33	2.10	3.30	4.43	4.53	4.07	11.86	SF
2	Miguel Tudela	Peru	2.60	0.73	4.33	0.47	5.20	0.67	1.61	9.53	SF
3	Isauro Elizondo	Panama	2.60	0.57	5.67	2.89				8.56	E
4	Alex Suárez	Ecuador	3.33	4.57	3.67	1.53	3.70			8.27	E

==== Heat 27 ====
Rank	Surfer	Nation	Waves						Total score	Notes
Rank	Surfer	Nation	1	2	3	4	5	6	Total score	Notes
1	Lucca Mesinas	Peru	6.17	4.67	4.07				10.84	SF
2	Messias Felix	Brazil	2.17	4.90	0.50	1.30	3.40	5.47	10.37	SF
3	Deivid Silva	Brazil	1.17	5.33	4.73	3.70			10.06	E
4	Roberto Araki	Chile	3.83	4.80	4.10	2.43			8.90	E

==== Heat 28 ====
Rank	Surfer	Nation	Waves					Total score	Notes
Rank	Surfer	Nation	1	2	3	4	5	Total score	Notes
1	Tomás López Moreno	Argentina	4.50	4.03	4.77	7.33		12.10	SF
2	Jean González	Panama	3.50	5.50	5.13	3.77	5.67	11.17	SF
3	Bryan Pérez	El Salvador	4.30	3.30	4.27	2.10		8.57	E
4	Sebastián Schneider	Costa Rica	3.07	2.73	1.00	3.93	0.97	7.00	E

=== Semi-finals ===
==== Heat 29 ====
Rank	Surfer	Nation	Waves							Total score	Notes
Rank	Surfer	Nation	1	2	3	4	5	6	7	Total score	Notes
1	Jean González	Panama	5.17	2.90	4.17	6.50				11.67	F
2	Mateus Sena	Brazil	3.33	1.13	1.37	6.00	5.50			11.50	F
3	Tao Rodríguez	Panama	5.50	1.00	1.87	4.97	1.53	1.23	2.20	10.47	E
4	Messias Felix	Brazil	1.27	1.53	4.10	1.10				5.63	E

==== Heat 30 ====
Rank	Surfer	Nation	Waves							Total score	Notes
Rank	Surfer	Nation	1	2	3	4	5	6	7	Total score	Notes
1	Miguel Tudela	Peru	6.50	7.33	8.83	0.50	1.00	2.83		16.16	F
2	Lucca Mesinas	Peru	1.00	5.00	0.57	5.97	7.10			13.07	F
3	Santiago Muñiz	Argentina	4.67	2.37	1.00	0.60				7.04	E
4	Tomás López Moreno	Argentina	2.00	1.30	3.43	3.07	2.67	2.30	2.47	6.50	E

=== Final ===
==== Heat 31 ====
Rank	Surfer	Nation	Waves							Total score	Notes
Rank	Surfer	Nation	1	2	3	4	5	6	7	Total score	Notes
1st place, gold medalist(s)	Mateus Sena	Brazil	6.83	1.83	0.87	6.93	1.33	0.77		13.76	
2nd place, silver medalist(s)	Jean González	Panama	9.00	4.40	1.20					13.40	
3rd place, bronze medalist(s)	Lucca Mesinas	Peru	6.50	1.00	0.87	6.87				13.37	
4	Miguel Tudela	Peru	0.50	4.33	1.43	0.50	0.80	4.80	7.23	12.03	
