= Surfing at the Pan American Games =

- No. of events: 8 (men: 4; women: 4)

This is the complete list of Pan American medalists in surfing.

== Medal table ==
Updated after the 2023 Pan American Games.

| Rank | Nation | Gold | Silver | Bronze | Total |
|---|---|---|---|---|---|
| 1 | Peru | 6 | 4 | 3 | 13 |
| 2 | United States | 4 | 1 | 2 | 7 |
| 3 | Brazil | 3 | 4 | 2 | 9 |
| 4 | Colombia | 3 | 0 | 0 | 3 |
| 5 | Argentina | 0 | 1 | 2 | 3 |
| 5 | Canada | 0 | 1 | 2 | 3 |
| 5 | Costa Rica | 0 | 1 | 2 | 3 |
| 8 | Chile | 0 | 1 | 0 | 1 |
| 8 | Ecuador | 0 | 1 | 0 | 1 |
| 8 | Uruguay | 0 | 1 | 0 | 1 |
| 8 | Venezuela | 0 | 1 | 0 | 1 |
| 12 | Puerto Rico | 0 | 0 | 2 | 2 |
| 13 | El Salvador | 0 | 0 | 1 | 1 |
| Totals (13 entries) | | 16 | 16 | 16 | 48 |

== Medalists ==
=== Men's events ===
==== Open Surf ====
| Event | Gold | Silver | Bronze |
|---|---|---|---|
| 2019 | Lucca Mesinas; Peru | Leandro Usuna; Argentina | Bryan Pérez; El Salvador |
| 2023 | Lucca Mesinas; Peru | Francisco Bellorín; Venezuela | Miguel Tudela; Peru |

==== SUP Surf ====
| Event | Gold | Silver | Bronze |
|---|---|---|---|
| 2019 | Giorgio Gómez; Colombia | Tamil Martino; Peru | Daniel Hughes; United States |
| 2023 | Zane Schweitzer; United States | Luiz Diniz; Brazil | Finn Spencer; Canada |

==== SUP Race ====
| Event | Gold | Silver | Bronze |
|---|---|---|---|
| 2019 | Connor Baxter; United States | Vinnicius Martins; Brazil | Itzel Delgado; Peru |
| 2023 | Connor Baxter; United States | Itzel Delgado; Peru | Santino Basaldella; Argentina |

==== Longboard ====
| Event | Gold | Silver | Bronze |
|---|---|---|---|
| 2019 | Benoit Clemente; Peru | Julián Schweizer; Uruguay | Cole Robbins; United States |
| 2023 | Benoit Clemente; Peru | Rafael Cortéz; Chile | Carlos Bahia; Brazil |

=== Women's events ===
==== Open Surf ====
| Event | Gold | Silver | Bronze |
|---|---|---|---|
| 2019 | Daniella Rosas; Peru | Dominic Barona; Ecuador | Ornella Pellizzari; Argentina |
| 2023 | Tatiana Weston-Webb; Brazil | Sanoa Dempfle-Olin; Canada | Leilani McGonagle; Costa Rica |

==== SUP Surf ====
| Event | Gold | Silver | Bronze |
|---|---|---|---|
| 2019 | Izzi Gómez; Colombia | Vania Torres; Peru | Nicole Pacelli; Brazil |
| 2023 | Izzi Gómez; Colombia | Aline Adisaka; Brazil | Vania Torres; Peru |

==== SUP Race ====
| Event | Gold | Silver | Bronze |
|---|---|---|---|
| 2019 | Lena Guimarães; Brazil | Candice Appleby; United States | Mariecarmen Rivera; Puerto Rico |
| 2023 | Candice Appleby; United States | Jennifer Kalmbach; Costa Rica | Mariecarmen Rivera; Puerto Rico |

==== Longboard ====
| Event | Gold | Silver | Bronze |
|---|---|---|---|
| 2019 | Chloé Calmon; Brazil | María Fernanda Reyes; Peru | Mathea Olin; Canada |
| 2023 | María Fernanda Reyes; Peru | Chloé Calmon; Brazil | Lia Reyes Dias; Costa Rica |
