= 2022 Pan American Surf Games – Women's Longboard =

Women's Longboard at the 2022 Pan American Surf Games
- Venue: Playa Venao
- Dates: 9–12 August 2022
- Winning score: 15.33 pts

Medalists
gold medal	Chloé Calmon	Brazil
silver medal	Atalanta Batista	Brazil
bronze medal	Camila Kaspar	Peru

The men's longboard competition at the 2022 Pan American Surf Games was held at Playa Venao in Pedasí District, Panama from 9 to 12 August 2022.

== Competition format ==
The competition consisted of four rounds:

- Round 1: 6 heats, 5 heats of 4 surfers and 1 of 3. The top 2 in each heat (12 total) advanced to quarter-finals.
- Quarter-finals: 4 heats of 3 surfers each; the top 2 in each heat (8 total) advanced to semi-finals.
- Semi-finals: 2 heats of 4 surfers each; the top 2 in each heat (4 total) advanced to the final.
- Final: 1 heat of 4 surfers.

The length of each heat was 20 minutes. Scoring for each wave taken by the surfers is an average of 5 scores given by 5 judges, ranging from 0 to 10 points. The best two waves for each surfer counting and are added to obtain the total score.

== Results ==
=== Round 1 ===
==== Heat 1 ====
Rank	Surfer	Nation	Waves							Total score	Notes
Rank	Surfer	Nation	1	2	3	4	5	6	7	Total score	Notes
1	Lucía Cosoleto	Argentina	1.97	2.53	1.77	2.30	0.97			4.83	QF
2	Iana Ramirez	Puerto Rico	2.50	1.97	1.13	0.87	1.20			4.47	QF
3	Delfina Morosini	Uruguay	0.50	1.73	1.13	0.67	0.77	0.47	1.60	3.33	E
4	Rachel Agüero	Costa Rica	1.50	0.90	0.67	1.10	1.33	0.37		2.83	E

==== Heat 2 ====
Rank	Surfer	Nation	Waves					Total score	Notes
Rank	Surfer	Nation	1	2	3	4	5	Total score	Notes
1	Chloé Calmon	Brazil	4.67	5.13	6.83	7.33	1.73	14.16	QF
2	Samantha Wilson	Chile	0.50	6.50	4.40	1.27	0.57	10.90	QF
3	Dominic Barona	Ecuador	0.43	0.87	1.57	1.20	1.83	3.40	E
4	Layla Brady	Panama	1.50	1.73	1.13	1.40	1.07	3.23	E

==== Heat 3 ====
Rank	Surfer	Nation	Waves					Total score	Notes
Rank	Surfer	Nation	1	2	3	4	5	Total score	Notes
1	Camila Kaspar	Peru	0.50	3.50	3.93	0.60	4.50	8.43	QF
2	Kelly Prada	Venezuela	2.17	0.60	2.30	0.37		4.47	QF
3	Risa Mara Machuca	Mexico	1.77	0.87	1.47			3.24	E
4	Andrea Vlieg	Panama	1.23	1.13	1.60	1.00	1.10	2.83	E

==== Heat 4 ====
Rank	Surfer	Nation	Waves						Total score	Notes
Rank	Surfer	Nation	1	2	3	4	5	6	Total score	Notes
1	Mafer Reyes	Peru	4.17	7.33	3.50	4.17	6.67		14.00	QF
2	Coco Bonilla	Mexico	5.33	1.10	5.83	1.97			11.16	QF
3	Betsy Salcedo	Venezuela	0.67	0.60	1.37	1.07	0.43	1.27	2.64	E

==== Heat 5 ====
Rank	Surfer	Nation	Waves								Total score	Notes
Rank	Surfer	Nation	1	2	3	4	5	6	7	8	Total score	Notes
1	Atalanta Batista	Brazil	5.17	0.50	5.83	6.17	6.77	5.80	6.70		13.47	QF
2	Fanny Villao	Ecuador	1.93	2.43	1.93	2.70	2.63				5.33	QF
3	Lorena Fica	Chile	0.77	1.80	1.53	2.07	0.27	0.80			3.87	E
4	Sofía Alfonso	Uruguay	1.00	0.50	1.30	0.93	0.63	1.27	0.37	1.10	2.57	E

==== Heat 6 ====
Rank	Surfer	Nation	Waves							Total score	Notes
Rank	Surfer	Nation	1	2	3	4	5	6	7	Total score	Notes
1	Ileana Hernandez	Puerto Rico	0.50	0.83	2.07	0.53	0.50	6.33		8.40	QF
2	Margarita Conde	Colombia	3.67	1.17	4.30	1.33	4.07			8.37	QF
3	Lía Díaz	Costa Rica	4.33	2.60	1.23	3.77	1.30			8.10	E
4	Amparo Errecalde	Argentina	2.67	2.90	3.30	1.03	1.70	3.30	2.80	6.60	E

=== Quarter-finals ===
==== Heat 7 ====
Rank	Surfer	Nation	Waves								Total score	Notes
Rank	Surfer	Nation	1	2	3	4	5	6	7	8	Total score	Notes
1	Chloé Calmon	Brazil	4.83	4.27	6.50	4.27	5.60				12.10	SF
2	Lucía Cosoleto	Argentina	2.17	1.97	1.57	2.67	2.20				4.87	SF
3	Kelly Prada	Venezuela	0.67	1.07	1.07	0.77	1.83	1.20	1.50	0.50	3.33	E

==== Heat 8 ====
Rank	Surfer	Nation	Waves									Total score	Notes
Rank	Surfer	Nation	1	2	3	4	5	6	7	8	9	Total score	Notes
1	Camila Kaspar	Peru	1.50	5.00	1.63	5.73	5.83	5.17	4.60	0.53	0.60	11.56	SF
2	Samantha Wilson	Chile	1.87	3.50	3.40	0.80	0.83	1.67	3.70	2.70		7.20	SF
3	Iana Ramirez	Puerto Rico	0.40	2.50	3.00	0.47	0.83	1.30	1.43			5.50	E

==== Heat 9 ====
Rank	Surfer	Nation	Waves							Total score	Notes
Rank	Surfer	Nation	1	2	3	4	5	6	7	Total score	Notes
1	Atalanta Batista	Brazil	6.00	2.33	1.47	2.93	4.43	4.57	2.70	10.57	SF
2	Mafer Reyes	Peru	0.93	1.67	4.53	0.73	1.87	5.70	3.50	10.23	SF
3	Margarita Conde	Colombia	1.50	1.27	0.93	3.60	2.17	2.87	3.07	6.67	E

==== Heat 10 ====
Rank	Surfer	Nation	Waves								Total score	Notes
Rank	Surfer	Nation	1	2	3	4	5	6	7	8	Total score	Notes
1	Coco Bonilla	Mexico	1.33	1.57	1.97	1.27	0.90	2.73	0.57	1.47	4.70	SF
2	Fanny Villao	Ecuador	2.33	1.93	2.03	2.37	0.57	2.17			4.70	SF
3	Ileana Hernandez	Puerto Rico	0.40	1.07	1.33	1.50	3.07	1.33			4.57	E

=== Semi-finals ===
==== Heat 11 ====
Rank	Surfer	Nation	Waves							Total score	Notes
Rank	Surfer	Nation	1	2	3	4	5	6	7	Total score	Notes
1	Chloé Calmon	Brazil	5.83	6.33	1.83	4.17	7.67	1.90	6.17	14.00	F
2	Camila Kaspar	Peru	0.83	3.83	4.53	2.93	3.37			8.36	F
3	Mafer Reyes	Peru	3.17	0.83	4.33	3.67	0.50	1.93	0.63	8.00	E
4	Fanny Villao	Ecuador	0.50	1.67	1.10	1.07	1.17	1.43		3.10	E

==== Heat 12 ====
Rank	Surfer	Nation	Waves									Total score	Notes
Rank	Surfer	Nation	1	2	3	4	5	6	7	8	9	Total score	Notes
1	Atalanta Batista	Brazil	0.50	1.00	5.33	6.33	1.73	1.30	4.50	3.30		11.66	F
2	Coco Bonilla	Mexico	1.67	0.90	4.00	0.57	1.10	0.50	0.50	3.37		7.37	F
3	Lucía Cosoleto	Argentina	0.60	1.23	1.20	0.70	1.50	3.07	2.50	1.00	3.23	6.30	E
4	Samantha Wilson	Chile	1.23	0.73	0.63	1.50	0.43	2.17	1.00	0.50	2.60	4.77	E

=== Final ===
==== Heat 13 ====
Rank	Surfer	Nation	Waves							Total score	Notes
Rank	Surfer	Nation	1	2	3	4	5	6	7	Total score	Notes
1st place, gold medalist(s)	Chloé Calmon	Brazil	0.83	4.67	4.60	6.83	8.50			15.33	
2nd place, silver medalist(s)	Atalanta Batista	Brazil	4.50	1.07	1.00	4.03	5.23	2.03		9.73	
3rd place, bronze medalist(s)	Camila Kaspar	Peru	2.50	3.77	3.07	3.90				7.67	
4	Coco Bonilla	Mexico	3.33	2.33	3.90	1.13	1.60	1.30	1.57	7.23	
