= 2022 Pan American Surf Games – Men's Longboard =

Men's Longboard at the 2022 Pan American Surf Games
- Venue: Playa Venao
- Dates: 9–12 August 2022
- Winning score: 13.26

Medalists
gold medal	Jefson Silva	Brazil
silver medal	Rodrigo Sphaier	Brazil
bronze medal	Nacho Pignataro	Uruguay

The men's longboard competition at the 2022 Pan American Surf Games was held at Playa Venao in Pedasí District, Panama from 9 to 12 August 2022.

== Competition format ==
The competition consisted of four rounds:

- Round 1: 8 heats, 4 heats of 4 surfers and 4 of 3. The top 2 in each heat (16 total) advanced to quarter-finals.
- Quarter-finals: 4 heats of 4 surfers each; the top 2 in each heat (8 total) advanced to semi-finals.
- Semi-finals: 2 heats of 4 surfers each; the top 2 in each heat (4 total) advanced to the final.
- Final: 1 heat of 4 surfers.

The length of each heat was 20 minutes. Scoring for each wave taken by the surfers is an average of 5 scores given by 5 judges, ranging from 0 to 10 points. The best two waves for each surfer counting and are added to obtain the total score.

== Results ==
=== Round 1 ===
==== Heat 1 ====
Rank	Surfer	Nation	Waves												Total score	Notes
Rank	Surfer	Nation	1	2	3	4	5	6	7	8	9	10	11	12	Total score	Notes
1	Jonathan Melendres	Mexico	6.67	4.20	4.57	5.80	6.87	6.37							13.54	QF
2	Surfiel Gil	Argentina	4.83	5.77	5.20	5.58	5.40	1.33	4.43	2.13					11.35	QF
3	Edwin Pérez	Panama	4.50	2.23	0.80	2.83									7.33	E
4	Saori Pérez	Dominican Republic	0.83	1.27	1.47	1.13	1.93	1.60	1.10	1.53	1.57	1.33	1.97	0.93	3.90	E

==== Heat 2 ====
Rank	Surfer	Nation	Waves							Total score	Notes
Rank	Surfer	Nation	1	2	3	4	5	6	7	Total score	Notes
1	Rodrigo Sphaier	Brazil	6.33	6.00	7.33	7.93	6.73			15.26	QF
2	Nicolás Ayala	Colombia	1.83	6.20	1.57	5.83	0.43	7.00	5.27	13.20	QF
3	Armando Colucci	Venezuela	3.83	0.60	2.17	2.43	0.87			6.26	E

==== Heat 3 ====
Rank	Surfer	Nation	Waves									Total score	Notes
Rank	Surfer	Nation	1	2	3	4	5	6	7	8	9	Total score	Notes
1	Julian Schweizer	Uruguay	6.00	4.93	6.57	5.33						12.57	QF
2	Dorian Torres	Costa Rica	3.17	4.23	4.67	4.17	4.00					8.90	QF
3	Alex Suárez	Ecuador	0.50	1.17	0.87	1.43	2.43	2.03	2.03	0.43	3.80	6.23	E
4	Carlos Escobar	Guatemala	1.00	0.83	2.77	1.10	2.03	0.90				4.80	E

==== Heat 4 ====
Rank	Surfer	Nation	Waves									Total score	Notes
Rank	Surfer	Nation	1	2	3	4	5	6	7	8	9	Total score	Notes
1	Lucas Garrido Lecca	Peru	4.67	7.33	4.73	5.27	0.67	5.67	7.10	6.33	6.00	14.43	QF
2	Rafael Cortez	Chile	3.17	5.17	3.37	4.57	3.00	4.43	5.80			10.97	QF
3	Miguel Flores	Puerto Rico	3.33	4.27	2.50	2.73	2.73	2.90	2.87	3.13		7.60	E

==== Heat 5 ====
Rank	Surfer	Nation	Waves								Total score	Notes
Rank	Surfer	Nation	1	2	3	4	5	6	7	8	Total score	Notes
1	Piccolo Clemente	Peru	5.00	6.17	7.00	6.60	8.83	6.47	4.27	6.03	15.83	QF
2	José Boza	Chile	2.33	4.23	4.63	4.40	3.23	5.53			10.16	QF
3	Rio Donaldson	Puerto Rico	4.00	3.57	3.47	3.73	3.33	4.83	3.83		8.83	E

==== Heat 6 ====
Rank	Surfer	Nation	Waves							Total score	Notes
Rank	Surfer	Nation	1	2	3	4	5	6	7	Total score	Notes
1	Nacho Pignataro	Uruguay	1.00	6.00	0.83	7.00	6.00	1.00		13.00	QF
2	Amado De Jesús Alvarado	El Salvador	4.50	7.00	3.67	5.00	5.03	4.13	2.73	12.03	QF
3	Marcelo Morán	Costa Rica	3.83	4.03	2.87	3.50	4.47			8.50	E
4	David Villamar	Ecuador	2.53	2.00	2.40	2.50	2.63	1.73	1.17	5.16	E

==== Heat 7 ====
Rank	Surfer	Nation	Waves							Total score	Notes
Rank	Surfer	Nation	1	2	3	4	5	6	7	Total score	Notes
1	Jefson Silva	Brazil	8.00	7.17	8.50	6.90	8.63	5.90	2.33	17.13	QF
2	César Rondón	Colombia	4.00	4.57						8.57	QF
3	José Antepaz	Venezuela	3.93	3.40	3.17	3.43	3.80			7.73	E

==== Heat 8 ====
Rank	Surfer	Nation	Waves									Total score	Notes
Rank	Surfer	Nation	1	2	3	4	5	6	7	8	9	Total score	Notes
1	Pablo Bonilla	Mexico	2.83	2.40	5.50	3.63	4.60					10.10	QF
2	Martín Perez	Argentina	3.43	2.50	4.20	5.03	4.17					9.23	QF
3	Agustín Cedeño	Panama	0.73	3.17	4.00	4.10	4.43	3.83	3.80	0.50	3.23	8.53	E
4	Cristian Padilla	Dominican Republic	0.83	2.50	4.20	3.17						7.37	E

=== Quarter-finals ===
==== Heat 9 ====
Rank	Surfer	Nation	Waves										Total score	Notes
Rank	Surfer	Nation	1	2	3	4	5	6	7	8	9	10	Total score	Notes
1	Rodrigo Sphaier	Brazil	6.50	7.83	3.57	7.07							14.90	SF
2	Dorian Torres	Costa Rica	2.67	2.57	0.67	5.67	5.10	3.83	6.10	2.10	2.33	0.93	11.77	SF
3	Jonathan Melendres	Mexico	4.00	0.50	2.60	5.80	1.63	2.57					9.80	E
4	Rafael Cortez	Chile	0.50	3.23	3.83	3.97	1.43	4.13	2.50	3.87			8.10	E

==== Heat 10 ====
Rank	Surfer	Nation	Waves										Total score	Notes
Rank	Surfer	Nation	1	2	3	4	5	6	7	8	9	10	Total score	Notes
1	Julian Schweizer	Uruguay	6.83	5.00	1.23	6.93	5.33						13.76	SF
2	Lucas Garrido Lecca	Peru	6.17	5.57	5.90	1.57	0.93						12.07	SF
3	Surfiel Gil	Argentina	1.60	1.90	5.17	1.50	3.90	2.03	1.57	1.37			9.07	E
4	Nicolás Ayala	Colombia	1.67	2.67	2.37	2.87	2.67	0.93	1.90	1.43	0.97	1.63	5.54	E

==== Heat 11 ====
Rank	Surfer	Nation	Waves								Total score	Notes
Rank	Surfer	Nation	1	2	3	4	5	6	7	8	Total score	Notes
1	Nacho Pignataro	Uruguay	0.83	6.00	4.50	2.43	5.30	5.83	4.67	0.90	11.83	SF
2	Piccolo Clemente	Peru	0.00 P1	3.25*	6.27	3.90	7.23	6.50			10.48	SF
3	Martín Perez	Argentina	3.17	3.60	2.73	3.30	1.90	1.83	3.97	0.50	7.57	E
4	César Rondón	Colombia	2.17	2.83	2.93	2.33	2.20				5.76	E

==== Heat 12 ====
Rank	Surfer	Nation	Waves									Total score	Notes
Rank	Surfer	Nation	1	2	3	4	5	6	7	8	9	Total score	Notes
1	Jefson Silva	Brazil	4.67	6.33	1.20	5.50	6.53	4.13	5.67			12.86	SF
2	José Boza	Chile	2.67	2.00	0.83	2.60	3.47	2.93	2.97	3.93	4.23	8.16	SF
3	Amado De Jesús Alvarado	El Salvador	2.27	0.93	1.07	3.37	2.77	0.73	3.27	2.87	1.57	6.64	E
4	Pablo Bonilla	Mexico	0.83	2.17	1.97	2.10	2.13	2.43	3.03	3.23		6.26	E

=== Semi-finals ===
==== Heat 13 ====
Rank	Surfer	Nation	Waves									Total score	Notes
Rank	Surfer	Nation	1	2	3	4	5	6	7	8	9	Total score	Notes
1	Rodrigo Sphaier	Brazil	0.83	8.00	6.47	6.93	6.87	6.53	1.27			14.93	F
2	Julian Schweizer	Uruguay	5.33	3.33	4.63	1.40	6.03	4.80				11.36	F
3	Piccolo Clemente	Peru	4.50	2.10	4.67	6.20	1.83	0.83	0.83	4.30		10.87	E
4	José Boza	Chile	0.90	2.63	3.67	4.03	4.57	1.23	4.13	4.17	3.30	8.74	E

==== Heat 14 ====
Rank	Surfer	Nation	Waves								Total score	Notes
Rank	Surfer	Nation	1	2	3	4	5	6	7	8	Total score	Notes
1	Jefson Silva	Brazil	8.00	0.67	7.27	8.27					16.27	F
2	Nacho Pignataro	Uruguay	2.83	1.33	7.30	6.93	2.70	2.67			14.23	F
3	Dorian Torres	Costa Rica	2.57	6.67	5.67	0.60	6.30	1.20	5.13	2.17	12.97	E
4	Lucas Garrido Lecca	Peru	4.00	1.77	5.67	4.13	5.43	3.00	5.93	6.23	12.16	E

=== Final ===
==== Heat 15 ====
Rank	Surfer	Nation	Waves					Total score	Notes
Rank	Surfer	Nation	1	2	3	4	5	Total score	Notes
1st place, gold medalist(s)	Jefson Silva	Brazil	7.33	5.93	5.13			13.26	
2nd place, silver medalist(s)	Rodrigo Sphaier	Brazil	3.00	5.67	0.83	5.13	6.53	12.20	
3rd place, bronze medalist(s)	Nacho Pignataro	Uruguay	6.07	3.43	3.90	3.33		9.97	
4	Julian Schweizer	Uruguay	4.50	4.77	2.63	1.17	2.63	9.27	
