= 2022 Pan American Surf Games – Women's SUP race =

Women's SUP race at the 2022 Pan American Surf Games
- Venue: Playa Venao
- Dates: 10 August 2022
- Competitors: 22 from 12 nations
- Winning time: 42:12.04

Medalists
gold medal	Lena Guimarães	Brazil
silver medal	Juliana González	Argentina
bronze medal	Natalia de la Lama	Argentina

The women's SUP race competition at the 2022 Pan American Surf Games was held at Playa Venao in Pedasí District, Panama on 10 August 2022.

The race had been originally scheduled to be held on 12 August, however, it was moved up to 10 July.

Brazilian Lena Guimarães won the gold medal with a time of 42:12.04.

== Results ==
Competitors had 60 minutes to complete the course. The results were as follows:

Rank	Name	Nation	Time	Points
1st place, gold medalist(s)	Lena Guimarães	Brazil	42:12.04	1000
2nd place, silver medalist(s)	Juliana González	Argentina	42:28.74	860
3rd place, bronze medalist(s)	Natalia de la Lama	Argentina	42:38.83	730
4	Aline Adisaka	Brazil	42:55.30	670
5	Stephanie Bodden	Panama	44:10.72	610
6	Nimsay García	Puerto Rico	45:14.66	583
7	Giannisa Vecco	Peru	47:38.12	555
8	Edimar Luque	Venezuela	48:11.55	528
9	Lisette Prado	Ecuador	51:21.72	500
10	Mariana Carrasco	Mexico	52:22.13	488
11	Xiomara Bowen	Ecuador	52:36.18	475
12	Camila Murguia	Peru	52:55.91	462
13	Aída Ramos	Mexico	53:05.17	450
14	Amanda Rivera	Puerto Rico	53:49.24	438
15	María Samudio	Panama	54:42.72	425
16	Betsy Salcedo	Venezuela	1:14:05.11	413
—	Samantha Wilson	Chile	DNF	0
—	Lorena Fica	Chile	DNF	0
—	Celia Barbosa	Uruguay	DNS	0
—	Marcela Machado	Uruguay	DNS	0
