= Surfing at the 2019 Pan American Games =

- Surfing pictogram
- Venue: Punta Rocas
- Dates: 30 July – 4 August 2019
- Competitors: 88

Surfing competitions at the 2019 Pan American Games were held between 30 July and 4 August 2019 at the Punta Rocas beach in the Punta Negra District of Peru.

The sport of surfing will be making its Pan American Games debut. In July 2015, days before the 2015 Pan American Games in Toronto, Canada, the then Panam Sports added the sport to the Pan American Games sports program. In 2016, the International Olympic Committee made several changes to its sports program, which were subsequently implemented for these games. Surfing was added, but was already included in the 2019 program a year earlier.

8 medal events are scheduled to be contested. Four per each gender A total of 88 surfers will qualify to compete at the games.

The event will be used as a qualifier for the 2020 Summer Olympics in Tokyo, Japan.

== Medal summary ==
=== Medal table ===
* Host nation (Peru)

| Rank | Nation | Gold | Silver | Bronze | Total |
|---|---|---|---|---|---|
| 1 | Peru* | 3 | 3 | 1 | 7 |
| 2 | Brazil | 2 | 1 | 1 | 4 |
| 3 | Colombia | 2 | 0 | 0 | 2 |
| 4 | United States | 1 | 1 | 2 | 4 |
| 5 | Argentina | 0 | 1 | 1 | 2 |
| 6 | Ecuador | 0 | 1 | 0 | 1 |
| 6 | Uruguay | 0 | 1 | 0 | 1 |
| 8 | Canada | 0 | 0 | 1 | 1 |
| 8 | El Salvador | 0 | 0 | 1 | 1 |
| 8 | Puerto Rico | 0 | 0 | 1 | 1 |
| Totals (10 entries) | | 8 | 8 | 8 | 24 |

=== Men's events ===
| Event | Gold | Silver | Bronze |
|---|---|---|---|
| Open surf | Lucca Mesinas; Peru | Leandro Usuna; Argentina | Bryan Pérez; El Salvador |
| SUP surf | Giorgio Gómez; Colombia | Tamil Martino; Peru | Daniel Hughes; United States |
| SUP race | Connor Baxter; United States | Vinnicius Martins; Brazil | Itzel Delgado; Peru |
| Longboard | Benoit Clemente; Peru | Julián Schweizer; Uruguay | Cole Robbins; United States |

=== Women's events ===
| Event | Gold | Silver | Bronze |
|---|---|---|---|
| Open surf | Daniella Rosas; Peru | Dominic Barona; Ecuador | Ornella Pellizzari; Argentina |
| SUP surf | Izzi Gómez; Colombia | Vania Torres; Peru | Nicole Pacelli; Brazil |
| SUP race | Lena Guimarães; Brazil | Candice Appleby; United States | Mariecarmen Rivera; Puerto Rico |
| Longboard | Chloé Calmon; Brazil | María Fernanda Reyes; Peru | Mathea Olin; Canada |

== Qualification ==
A total of 88 surfers will qualify across various qualification tournaments. The host nation Peru, will be automatically be allocated ten quota spots across the eight events. A country can enter a maximum ten surfers (five per gender).

== See also ==
- Surfing at the 2020 Summer Olympics
