= 2022 Pan American Surf Games – Men's SUP race =

Men's SUP race at the 2022 Pan American Surf Games
- Venue: Playa Venao
- Dates: 10 August 2022
- Competitors: 22 from 12 nations
- Winning time: 37:36.99

Medalists
gold medal	Itzel Delgado	Peru
silver medal	David Leão	Brazil
bronze medal	Franco Fachin	Argentina

The men's SUP race competition at the 2022 Pan American Surf Games was held at Playa Venao in Pedasí District, Panama on 10 August 2022.

The race had been originally scheduled to take place on 12 August, however, it was moved up to 10 July.

Peruvian Itzel Delgado won the gold medal with a mark of 37:36.99. It was the third Pan American SUP race title for Delgado.

== Results ==
Competitors had 60 minutes to complete the course. The results were as follows:

Rank	Name	Nation	Time	Points
1st place, gold medalist(s)	Itzel Delgado	Peru	37:36.99	1000
2nd place, silver medalist(s)	David Leão	Brazil	37:38.30	860
3rd place, bronze medalist(s)	Franco Fachin	Argentina	38:31.48	730
4	Omelv García	Puerto Rico	39:06.91	670
5	Luiz Guida	Brazil	39:07.28	610
6	Ricardo Ávila	Puerto Rico	39:08.96	583
7	Felipe Marthe	Colombia	39:29.76	555
8	Edonays Cabello	Panama	39:30.95	528
9	Fabrizio Rondinara	Argentina	40:55.05	500
10	Lukas Rodríguez	Uruguay	43:04.59	488
11	Vicente Vilanova	Venezuela	43:33.12	475
12	Fernando Amaral	Mexico	43:52.52	462
13	David Ibern	Colombia	43:57.62	450
14	Gilberto Soto	Panama	44:49.41	438
15	Héctor González	Mexico	45:09.66	425
16	David Villamar	Ecuador	45:41.40	413
17	Sebastián Ríos	Peru	48:01.91	400
18	Christophe Conry	Chile	51:03.49	395
19	Armando Colucci	Venezuela	51:38.97	390
20	Franco Bono	Chile	54:39.41	385
21	Axel Castro	Costa Rica	58:45.01	380
—	Francisco Pérez	Uruguay	DNS	0
