= 2022 Pan American Surf Games – Men's SUP surf =

Men's SUP surf at the 2022 Pan American Surf Games
- Venue: Playa Venao
- Dates: 8–11 August 2022
- Winning score: 16.17 pts

Medalists
gold medal	Luiz Diniz	Brazil
silver medal	Felipe Rodríguez	Mexico
bronze medal	Tamil Martino	Peru

The men's SUP surf competition at the 2022 Pan American Surf Games was held at Playa Venao in Pedasí District, Panama from 8 to 11 August 2022.

== Competition format ==
The competition consists of four rounds:

- Round 1: 6 heats, 5 heats of 4 surfers and 1 of 3. The top 2 in each heat (12 total) advanced to quarter-finals.
- Quarter-finals: 4 heats of 3 surfers each; the top 2 in each heat (8 total) advanced to semi-finals.
- Semi-finals: 2 heats of 4 surfers each; the top 2 in each heat (4 total) advanced to the final.
- Final: 1 heat of 4 surfers, with the top three earning medals.

The length of each heat was 20 minutes. Scoring for each wave taken by the surfers is an average of 5 scores given by 5 judges, ranging from 0.1 to 10 points. The best two waves for each surfer counting and are added to obtain the total score.

== Results ==
=== Round 1 ===
==== Heat 1 ====
Rank	Surfer	Nation	Waves									Total score	Notes
Rank	Surfer	Nation	1	2	3	4	5	6	7	8	9	Total score	Notes
1	Dave Allen De Armas	Puerto Rico	7.00	3.90	3.93	1.00	0.97	4.30	3.63			11.30	QF
2	Maxi Prenski	Argentina	3.33	2.50	2.50	2.67	3.77	2.07	3.33	3.23	1.00	7.10	QF
3	David Villamar	Ecuador	2.33	2.93	0.73	3.03	3.13	1.63	2.33	1.87		6.16	E
4	Salvador Rametta	Uruguay	0.50									0.50	E

==== Heat 2 ====
Rank	Surfer	Nation	Waves						Total score	Notes
Rank	Surfer	Nation	1	2	3	4	5	6	Total score	Notes
1	Héctor González	Mexico	6.17	6.50	5.00				12.67	QF
2	Leonardo Gimenes	Brazil	1.20	4.00	2.77	5.43			9.43	QF
3	Ricardo Chiari	Panama	1.33	0.67	2.23	2.57	0.90		6.70	E
4	Cristophe Conry	Chile	1.27	2.33	2.00	2.43	1.77	2.27	4.76	E

==== Heat 3 ====
Rank	Surfer	Nation	Waves								Total score	Notes
Rank	Surfer	Nation	1	2	3	4	5	6	7	8	Total score	Notes
1	Felipe Rodríguez	Mexico	5.17	1.40	7.33	4.57	5.50	3.43	6.27	5.77	13.60	QF
2	Franco Bono	Chile	4.17	3.17	4.67	3.70	3.70	1.63			8.84	QF
3	Sebastián Ríos	Peru	2.17	1.53	2.23	2.77	3.33	2.60	1.37	2.93	6.26	E
4	Edonays Caballero	Panama	1.03	1.23	1.73	1.83	1.03	1.90	1.30		3.73	E

==== Heat 4 ====
Rank	Surfer	Nation	Waves									Total score	Notes
Rank	Surfer	Nation	1	2	3	4	5	6	7	8	9	Total score	Notes
1	Tamil Martino	Peru	5.17	5.67	5.73	6.83	2.30	3.97	5.83	2.07	5.97	12.80	QF
2	Armando Colucci	Venezuela	2.67	3.53	0.67	1.23	3.83	1.40	1.0			7.36	QF
3	José Joaquín López	Venezuela	1.00	1.60	2.17	2.70	2.47					5.17	E

==== Heat 5 ====
Rank	Surfer	Nation	Waves										Total score	Notes
Rank	Surfer	Nation	1	2	3	4	5	6	7	8	9	10	Total score	Notes
1	Luiz Diniz	Brazil	5.00	4.33	5.40	1.00	0.47	5.70	6.67	1.53	5.50	0.43	12.37	QF
2	Max Torres	Puerto Rico	4.33	5.17	2.47	2.20							9.50	QF
3	Julio Hidalgo	Ecuador	1.60	2.90	3.30	3.50	3.20	2.87					6.80	E
4	Martin Ottado	Uruguay	0.50	1.20	1.27	1.17	1.80	1.40					3.20	E

==== Heat 6 ====
Rank	Surfer	Nation	Waves									Total score	Notes
Rank	Surfer	Nation	1	2	3	4	5	6	7	8	9	Total score	Notes
1	Gerónimo Roger	Argentina	5.00	3.43	4.40	1.00	3.47	3.63	3.77	1.00	4.07	9.40	QF
2	Felipe Marthe	Colombia	1.00	4.00	2.73	2.57	3.63					7.63	QF
3	José Ruiz	Costa Rica	2.93	2.83	3.43	2.80	2.70	3.43	2.27			6.86	E
4	David Ibern	Colombia	3.23	2.77	1.03	2.43	1.10	2.87	2.80	2.50		6.10	E

=== Quarter-finals ===
==== Heat 7 ====
Rank	Surfer	Nation	Waves							Total score	Notes
Rank	Surfer	Nation	1	2	3	4	5	6	7	Total score	Notes
1	Dave Allen De Armas	Puerto Rico	0.70	1.73	3.80	4.80	5.43	5.40	2.53	10.83	SF
2	Franco Bono	Chile	3.17	3.73	4.83	4.03	1.03			8.86	SF
3	Héctor González	Mexico	1.00	2.93	2.93	2.80	3.43	0.67	0.70	6.36	E

==== Heat 8 ====
Rank	Surfer	Nation	Waves						Total score	Notes
Rank	Surfer	Nation	1	2	3	4	5	6	Total score	Notes
1	Felipe Rodríguez	Mexico	9.00	6.50	7.17	6.77	7.67	2.40	16.67	SF
2	Leonardo Gimenes	Brazil	3.67	6.33	6.83	4.33	4.93		13.16	SF
3	Maxi Prenski	Argentina	3.17	1.23	0.50	2.90	2.80	2.77	6.07	E

==== Heat 9 ====
Rank	Surfer	Nation	Waves								Total score	Notes
Rank	Surfer	Nation	1	2	3	4	5	6	7	8	Total score	Notes
1	Tamil Martino	Peru	5.83	5.23	3.70	1.30	6.27	1.40	7.33		13.60	SF
2	Luiz Diniz	Brazil	4.37	2.83	4.40	0.50	6.00	1.27	6.90	3.37	12.90	SF
3	Felipe Marthe	Colombia	4.00	5.30	1.93	2.93					9.30	E

==== Heat 10 ====
Rank	Surfer	Nation	Waves									Total score	Notes
Rank	Surfer	Nation	1	2	3	4	5	6	7	8	9	Total score	Notes
1	Max Torres	Puerto Rico	0.00 P1	5.00	3.34*	5.00	6.83	1.03	6.50	1.10	4.47	10.17	SF
2	Gerónimo Roger	Argentina	0.00 P1	2.50	2.93	1.97*	3.40	0.90	3.67	3.13	4.80	6.77	SF
3	Armando Colucci	Venezuela	2.17	2.27	2.77	0.50	1.70	3.23				6.00	E

=== Semi-finals ===
==== Heat 11 ====
Rank	Surfer	Nation	Waves							Total score	Notes
Rank	Surfer	Nation	1	2	3	4	5	6	7	Total score	Notes
1	Luiz Diniz	Brazil	3.40	2.50	6.17	5.67	9.00	0.67	3.53	15.17	F
2	Felipe Rodríguez	Mexico	4.50	7.17	3.00	5.30				12.47	F
3	Dave Allen De Armas	Puerto Rico	5.83	5.80	0.50	4.07	5.03			11.63	E
4	Gerónimo Roger	Argentina	3.00	3.33	3.90	3.57	3.67	4.10		8.00	E

==== Heat 12 ====
Rank	Surfer	Nation	Waves						Total score	Notes
Rank	Surfer	Nation	1	2	3	4	5	6	Total score	Notes
1	Leonardo Gimenes	Brazil	7.17	4.77	3.57	6.60	1.17		13.77	F
2	Tamil Martino	Peru	3.83	5.33	5.20	4.83	0.50		10.53	F
3	Max Torres	Puerto Rico	1.17	0.90	4.70	4.00			8.70	E
4	Franco Bono	Chile	1.50	2.77	2.10	4.33	2.57	3.33	7.66	E

=== Final ===
==== Heat 13 ====
Rank	Surfer	Nation	Waves									Total score	Notes
Rank	Surfer	Nation	1	2	3	4	5	6	7	8	9	Total score	Notes
1st place, gold medalist(s)	Luiz Diniz	Brazil	8.67	7.50	3.50	3.60						16.17	
2nd place, silver medalist(s)	Felipe Rodríguez	Mexico	5.50	4.97	6.87	5.20						12.37	
3rd place, bronze medalist(s)	Tamil Martino	Peru	1.67	2.23	4.83	4.47	6.00	1.17	6.00	2.83	4.40	12.00	
4	Leonardo Gimenes	Brazil	1.80	6.17	4.47	3.73	3.87	1.40	3.00			10.64	
