= 2025 ISA World Junior Surfing Championship =

Surfing competition

- Venue: Punta Rocas
- Location: Lima, Peru
- Date: 5–14 December 2025

The 2025 ISA World Junior Surfing Championship took place at Punta Rocas in the province of Lima in Peru, from 5 to 14 December 2025. It was the 21st edition of the event and was organised by the International Surfing Association (ISA).

== Medal summary ==
=== Medallists ===
==== Under 18 ====
| Event | Gold | Silver | Bronze |
|---|---|---|---|
| Boys | Dylan Donegan; Spain | Jacob Turner; Hawaii | Tiger Abubo; Hawaii |
| Girls | Sol Borelli; Spain | Milla Coco Brown; Australia | Clémence Schorsch; France |

==== Under 16 ====
| Event | Gold | Silver | Bronze |
|---|---|---|---|
| Boys | Ocean Lancaster; Australia | Thiago Passeri; Argentina | Caden Francis; Australia |
| Girls | Bailey Turner; United States | Catalina Zariquiey; Peru | Lucy Darragh; Australia |

==== Team ====
| Event | Gold | Silver | Bronze |
|---|---|---|---|
| Points | Australia | United States | Brazil |

=== Medal table ===
* Host nation (Peru)

| Rank | Nation | Gold | Silver | Bronze | Total |
|---|---|---|---|---|---|
| 1 | Australia (AUS) | 2 | 1 | 2 | 5 |
| 2 | Spain (ESP) | 2 | 0 | 0 | 2 |
| 3 | United States (USA) | 1 | 1 | 0 | 2 |
| 4 | Hawaii (HAW) | 0 | 1 | 1 | 2 |
| 5 | Argentina (ARG) | 0 | 1 | 0 | 1 |
| 5 | Peru (PER)* | 0 | 1 | 0 | 1 |
| 7 | Brazil (BRA) | 0 | 0 | 1 | 1 |
| 7 | France (FRA) | 0 | 0 | 1 | 1 |
| Totals (8 entries) | | 5 | 5 | 5 | 15 |

== See also ==
- 2025 ISA World Surfing Games
