= Surfing at the 2023 Pan American Games – Men's shortboard =

Men's shortboard at the 2023 Pan American Games
- Venue: Punta de Lobos beach
- Dates: October 24 - October 27; October 30
- Competitors: 16 from 9 nations

Medalists
Gold medal	Lucca Mesinas	Peru
Silver medal	Francisco Bellorín	Venezuela
Bronze medal	Miguel Tudela	Peru

The men's shortboard competition of the surfing events at the 2023 Pan American Games was held from October 24 to 30 at Punta de Lobos beach in Pichilemu, Chile.

== Schedule ==
Date	Time	Round
October 24, 2023	13:22	Main Round 1
October 25, 2023	11:04	Repechage Round 1
October 26, 2023	09:32	Main Round 2
October 26, 2023	12:32	Repechage Round 2
October 26, 2023	17:12	Repechage Round 3
October 27, 2023	08:00	Main Round 3
October 27, 2023	11:04	Repechage Round 4
October 27, 2023	15:40	Repechage Round 5
October 27, 2023	16:26	Main Round 4
October 30, 2023	09:52	Finals

== Results ==
=== Finals ===
The winner of the bronze medal match advances to the gold metal match while the loser receives the bronze medal.

Gold medal match
Francisco Bellorín (VEN)	9.10
Lucca Mesinas (PER)	13.16
Bronze medal match
Lucca Mesinas (PER)	15.50
Miguel Tudela (PER)	8.57

=== Elimination rounds ===
The winners of each match advance to the next round while the losers advance to their respective round in the repechage. The results during the elimination rounds were as follows:

Round 1
Miguel Tudela (PER)	14.27
José Joaquín López (VEN)	11.60
Krystian Kymerson (BRA)	10.04
Marcos Correa (BRA)	8.80
Leandro Usuna (ARG)	15.83
Franco Rodziunas (ARG)	7.33
Luccas Mesinas (PER)	17.67
Guillermo Satt (CHI)	8.67
Alan Cleland (MEX)	12.83
Manuel Selman (CHI)	9.77
Isauro Elizondo (PAN)	6.10
Jean Carlos González (PAN)	7.90
Sebastián Williams (MEX)	9.96
Oscar Urbina (CRC)	13.04
Cody Young (CAN)	9.50
Francisco Bellorín (VEN)	12.93

Round 2
Miguel Tudela (PER)	12.33
Krystian Kymerson (BRA)	11.53
Leandro Usuna (ARG)	5.60
Lucca Mesinas (PER)	10.66
Alan Cleland (MEX)	16.00
Jean Carlos González (PAN)	4.80
Oscar Urbina (CRC)	5.00
Francisco Bellorín (VEN)	10.46

Round 3
Miguel Tudela (PER)	13.96
Lucca Mesinas (PER)	11.83
Alan Cleland (MEX)	4.93
Francisco Bellorín (VEN)	8.53

Round 4
Miguel Tudela (PER)	8.66
Francisco Bellorín (VEN)	12.33

=== Repechage ===
The winners of each match advances to the next round. The winner of the fifth round advance to the bronze medal match. The results during the repechage rounds were as follows:

Round 1
José Joaquín López (VEN)	4.50
Marcos Correa (BRA)	16.16
Franco Radzunias (ARG)	5.84
Guillermo Satt (CHI)	10.53
Manuel Selman (CHI)	7.50
Isauro Elizondo (PAN)	6.60
Sebastián Williams (MEX)	10.14
Cody Young (CAN)	12.33

Round 2
Marcos Correa (BRA)	7.40
Krystian Kymerson (BRA)	14.50
Guillermo Satt (CHI)	9.90
Leandro Usuna (ARG)	10.96
Manuel Selman (CHI)	4.86
Jean Carlos González (PAN)	10.50
Cody Young (CAN)	11.20
Oscar Urbina (CRC)	11.17

Round 3
Krystian Kymerson (BRA)	13.86
Leandro Usuna (ARG)	9.00
Jean Carlos González (PAN)	9.37
Cody Young (CAN)	14.50

Round 4
Krystian Kymerson (BRA)	10.43
Lucca Mesinas (PER)	10.80
Cody Young (CAN)	11.00
Alan Cleland (MEX)	6.87

Round 5
Lucca Mesinas (PER)	14.67
Cody Young (CAN)	13.83
