= 2025 ISA World Surfing Games =

Surfing event in El Salvador

- Venue: La Bocana and El Sunzal
- Location: Surf City, El Salvador
- Date: 5–14 September 2025

The 2025 ISA World Surfing Games took place on the La Bocana and El Sunzal waves at Surf City, El Salvador, from 5 to 14 September 2025. The event was organised by the International Surfing Association (ISA).

== Medal summary ==
=== Medallists ===
Event	Gold	Silver	Bronze
Men	Dane Henry; Australia	Kauli Vaast; France	Morgan Cibilic; Australia
Women	Janire González Etxabarri; Spain	Yolanda Hopkins; Portugal	Sally Fitzgibbons; Australia
Team Points	Australia; Morgan Cibilic; Dane Henry; Callum Robson; Milla Brown; Sally Fitzgibbons; Ellie Harrison	Peru; Alonso Correa; Lucca Mesinas; Lucas Pérez del Solar; Sol Aguirre; Arena Rodríguez; Daniella Rosas	Spain; Luis Díaz; Yago Domínguez; Ruben Vitoria; Nadia Erostarbe; Annette González Etxabarri; Janire González Etxabarri

- Standings after the event

=== Medal table ===
* Host nation (El Salvador)

Rank	Nation	Gold	Silver	Bronze	Total
1	Australia (AUS)	2	0	2	4
2	Spain (ESP)	1	0	1	2
3	France (FRA)	0	1	0	1
3	Peru (PER)	0	1	0	1
3	Portugal (POR)	0	1	0	1
Totals (5 entries)		3	3	3	9

== See also ==
- 2025 World Surf League
- 2025 ISA World Junior Surfing Championship
