= Francisco Bellorín =

Venezuelan surfer

Surfing career
- Sport: Surfing
Medal record
Men's surfing
Representing Venezuela
Pan American Games
| Silver medal – second place | 2023 Santiago | Shortboard |

Francisco Bellorín is a Venezuelan surfer. He qualified to participate in the 2019 Pan American Games in Lima, Peru, and won a silver medal at the men's shortboard surf category of the 2023 Pan American Games in Santiago, Chile.
