= Bryan Pérez (surfer) =

Salvadoran surfer

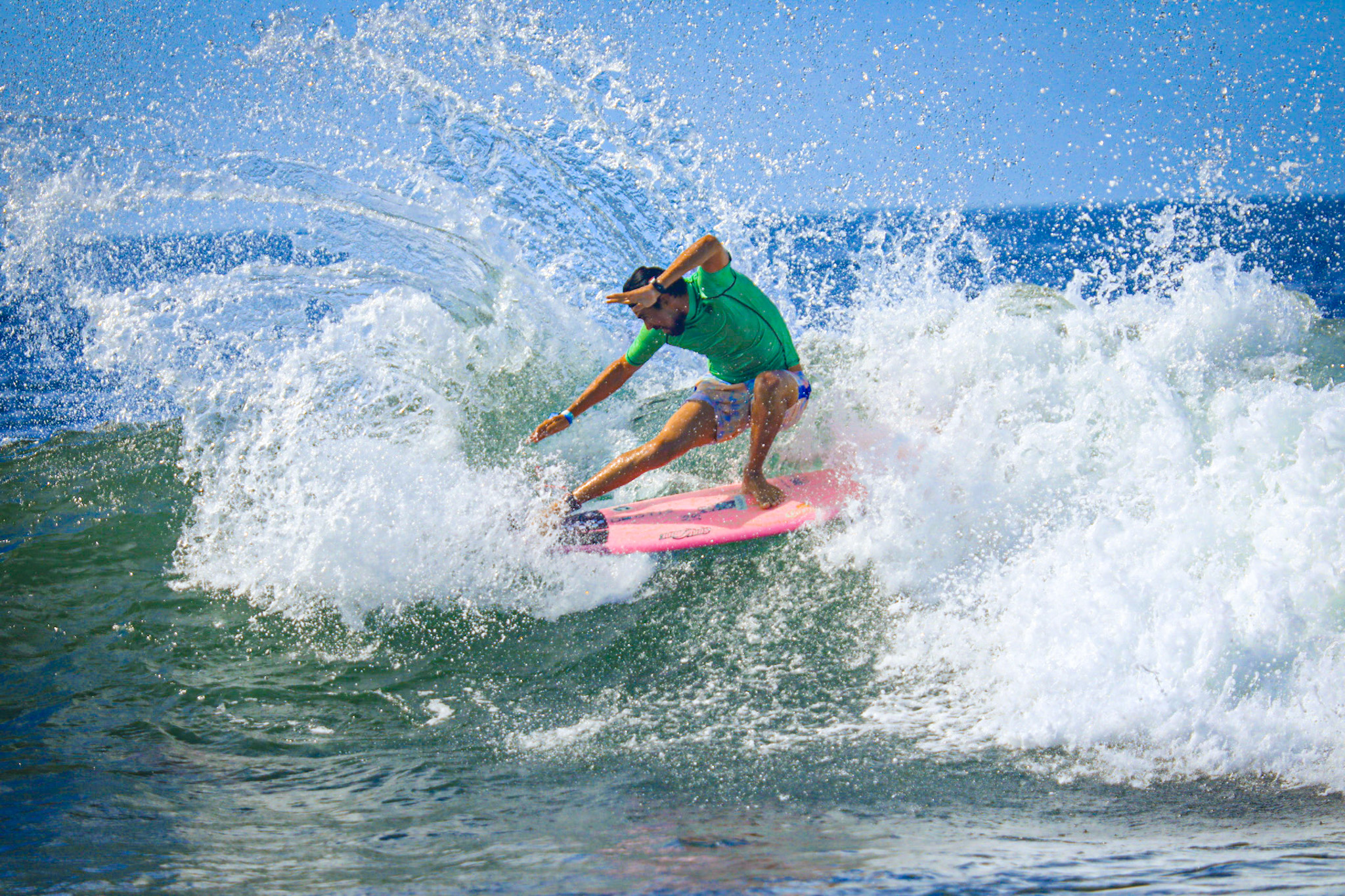
- Bryan Pérez at the ISA World Surfing Games 2023 in Surf City, El Salvador.

Personal information
- Nationality: Salvadoran
- Born: September 10, 1999 (age 26) La Libertad, El Salvador

Sport
- Sport: Surfing
Medal record
Men's surfing
Representing El Salvador
Pan American Games
Bronze medal – third place	Lima 2019	Open surf
Central American and Caribbean Games
Bronze medal – third place	San Salvador 2023	Shortboard

Bryan Pérez (born 10 September 1999) is a Salvadoran professional surfer, recognized as the first athlete from his country to qualify for Olympic surfing. Born and raised in the coastal community of Punta Roca, in La Libertad, he overcame social adversity to become a leading figure in Central American and Latin American surfing. His career has been noted both for his sporting achievements and for his social impact, inspiring young people from vulnerable communities.

== Early life ==
Pérez grew up in the community of Punta Roca, known for its ideal surf waves. As a child, he became involved in the surfing environment, helping to guard cars or carry surfboards for visitors, who occasionally gave him pieces of broken boards. With those scraps, he improvised his first practices in the sea. Despite poverty and local violence, surfing offered him a different path and a way of life.

== Professional career ==
Pérez began competing as a teenager in national and regional tournaments. In 2019, he achieved one of El Salvador’s greatest surfing milestones by winning the bronze medal at the 2019 Pan American Games in Lima, Peru. It was the country’s first medal in surfing at a continental games.

In 2023, he became champion of the ALAS Pro Tour at Playa Las Flores, El Salvador, defeating Peruvian surfer Lucca Mesinas. In November of the same year, he also won the Corona Pro Surf Circuit in Puerto Rico, standing out with one of the highest scores of the event.

== Olympic qualification ==
In May 2024, Pérez was confirmed as a participant in the 2024 Summer Olympics in Paris, thanks to a universality invitation from the International Olympic Committee and the International Surfing Association (ISA). The Olympic surfing competition was held at Teahupo'o, Tahiti. He became the first Salvadoran surfer to compete at the Olympic Games.

== Legacy ==
Beyond his athletic achievements, Pérez has become a symbolic figure in El Salvador, promoting sport as a tool for social transformation. He has participated in community and youth surf projects, seeking to inspire new talent in vulnerable areas of the country.

== International results ==
Year	Location	Medal	Event
Pan American Games
2019	(Peru) Lima	3rd place, bronze medalist(s)	Open surf
Central American and Caribbean Games
Year	Location	Medal	Event
2023	(El Salvador) Surf City	3rd place, bronze medalist(s)	Shortboard
ALAS Pro Tour
Year	Location	Medal	Event
2023	(El Salvador) Surf City	1st place, gold medalist(s)	Shortboard
