= Margarita Conde =

Guatemalan long-distance runner

Personal information
- Born: 19 June 1960 (age 65)

Sport
- Country: Guatemala
- Sport: Long-distance running

Margarita Conde (born 19 June 1960) is a Guatemalan long-distance runner. In 2001, she competed in the women's marathon at the 2001 World Championships in Athletics held in Edmonton, Alberta, Canada. She finished in 49th place.
