= Miguel Tudela (surfer) =

Peruvian surfer

Personal information
- Full name: Miguel Tudela Chiozza
- Nationality: Peru
- Born: 26 December 1994 (age 31) Punta Hermosa, Peru
- Height: 5 ft 8 in (173 cm)
- Weight: 141 lb (64 kg)

Sport
- Sport: Surfing
Medal record
Men's surfing
Representing Peru
World Championships
Gold medal – first place	2023 La Bocana	Team
Bronze medal – third place	2023 La Bocana	Men
Pan American Games
Bronze medal – third place	2023 Santiago	Men

Miguel Tudela Chiozza (Note: In this Spanish name, the first or paternal surname is Tudela and the second or maternal family name is Chiozza.) (born 26 December 1994) is a Peruvian surfer. He competed in the 2020 Summer Olympics.
