= Lucca Mesinas =

Olympic surfer from Peru

Personal information
- Born: 20 April 1996 (age 30) Lima, Peru

Surfing career
- Sport: Surfing
- Major achievements: 2019 Pan American Games Champion

Surfing specifications
- Stance: Regular (natural foot)
Medal record
Men's surfing
Representing Peru
World Games
Gold medal – first place	2023 La Bocana	Team
Silver medal – second place	2016 Jacó	Men
Silver medal – second place	2023 La Bocana	Men
Silver medal – second place	2025 Surf City	Team
Bronze medal – third place	2018 Tahara	Men
Pan American Games
Gold medal – first place	2019 Lima	Shortboard
Gold medal – first place	2023 Santiago	Shortboard

Lucca Mesinas (born 20 April 1996) is a Peruvian surfer. He qualified for the 2024 Olympic Games.

In 2020, Mesinas won the inaugural edition of the Gordo Barreda Cup, a tribute to Peruvian surfing legend Sergio Barreda.

He placed 7th overall at the 2021 ISA World Surfing Games, where he qualified for the 2020 Summer Olympics. He competed in the men's shortboard event, winning his Round 1 heat over top American surfer Kolohe Andino.

He was raised in the beach town of Máncora.

Olympic Games
Preceded by Francisco Boza	Flag bearer for Peru; Tokyo 2020 with Daniella Rosas	Succeeded by Ornella Oettl Reyes
