= Mimi Barona =

Ecuadorian surfer (born 1991)

Personal information
- Born: Dominic Isabel Barona Matute; 10 February 1991 (age 35) Montañita, Ecuador

Surfing career
- Sport: Surfing
Medal record
Women's Surfing
Representing Ecuador
Bolivarian Games
| Gold medal – first place | 2013 Trujillo | open |
| Gold medal – first place | 2016 Iquique | open shortboard |
Pan American Games
| Silver medal – second place | 2019 Lima | open surf |

Dominic Isabel Barona Matute (Note: In this Spanish name, the first or paternal surname is Barona and the second or maternal family name is Matute.) (born 10 February 1991) is an Ecuadorian surfer. She is regarded as one of the prominent surfers in Ecuador. Her brother Israel Barona is also a surfer who represents Ecuador at international level. She is the first surfer from Ecuador to have competed at the Olympics.

== Career ==
Barona pursued her interest in surfing at the age of 13 after being influenced by her older brother Israel. Little by little, she began to follow the Alas circuit in Peru, then in Costa Rica and Panama. In 2014, she claimed second place at the ISA 50TH World Surfing Games which was held in Punta Rocas, Peru. In this event, Mimi achieved the highest score in a round in the history of the event. However, Peruvian surfer Analí Gómez clinched victory with a score of 12.86 while Mimi finished with the score of 12.53.

Dominic was the flagbearer for Ecuador during the 2016 Bolivarian Beach Games and also claimed a gold medal in the women's open shortboard event during the 2016 Bolivarian Games. She became the South American champion of the World Surf League in 2018 with a total score of 4,310 followed by Melanie Giunia of Peru who had a final score of 3,260 units. She also emerged as the winner of the 2019 Corona Pro Surf Circuit, organized by the National Surf Organization in Puerto Rico.

She represented Ecuador at the 2019 Pan American Games and secured a silver medal in the women's open surf whereas Daniella Rosas of Peru clinched the gold medal. She also notably became the first Ecuadorian surfer to win a medal in surfing at the Pan American Games. She also qualified to compete at the 2020 Summer Olympics where surfing was included for the first time in Olympics.

She preferred to compete at the 2019 Pan American Games over the World Surf League tour events despite the WSL tour events were also considered as Olympic qualifying events. However, she was eligible to compete at the delayed 2020 Tokyo Olympics following her medal success at the 2019 Pan American Games. She represented Ecuador at the 2020 Summer Olympics which also marked her debut appearance at the Olympics. She was also the only Ecuadorian surfer to participate at the 2020 Summer Olympics. She was eliminated from the round 2 of the women's shortboard event.
