= Julián Schweizer =

Uruguayan surfer

Personal information
- Nationality: Uruguayan
- Born: 1998 (age 27–28)

Sport
- Country: Uruguay
- Sport: Surfing
Medal record
Men's surfing
Representing Uruguay
Pan American Games
Silver medal – second place	2019 Lima	Longboard

Julián Schweizer (born 1998) is a Uruguayan surfer. In 2019, he was awarded the silver medal at the Pan American Games in Lima, Peru.
