= Daniella Rosas =

Olympic surfer from Peru

Personal information
- Born: 21 January 2002 (age 24) Lima, Peru

Surfing career
- Sport: Surfing
- Major achievements: 2019 Pan American Games Champion

Surfing specifications
- Stance: Regular
Medal record
Surfing
Representing Peru
Pan American Games
Gold medal – first place	2019 Lima	Open surf
World Games
Gold medal – first place	2023 La Bocana	Team
Silver medal – second place	2025 Surf City	Team

Daniella Rosas (born 21 January 2002) is a Peruvian surfer. She placed 4th overall at the 2021 ISA World Surfing Games, where she qualified for the 2020 Summer Olympics. She competed in the women's shortboard event, where she was eliminated in Round 2 of the event.

Olympic Games
Preceded by Francisco Boza	Flag bearer for Peru; Tokyo 2020 with Lucca Mesinas	Succeeded by Ornella Oettl Reyes
