= Pedasí District =

- District
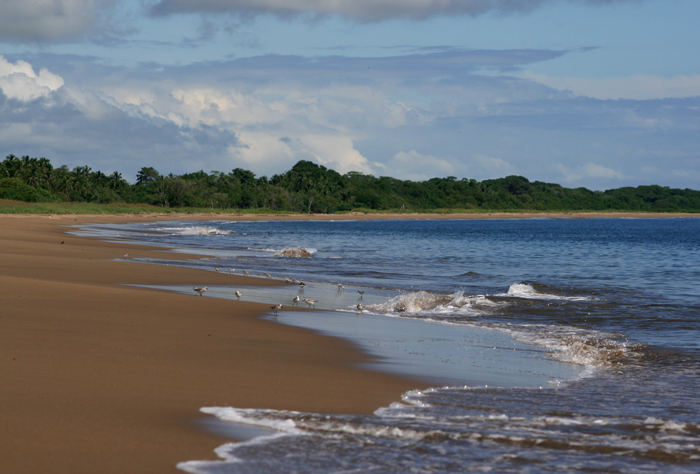
- Playa El Arenal, Pedasí, Los Santos

- Coat of arms

- Location of the district capital in Panama
- Coordinates: 7°33′N 80°1′W
- Country: Panama
- Province: Los Santos Province
- Capital: Pedasí

Area
  - Total: 146.1 sq mi (378.3 km^{2})

Population (2020)
  - Total: 4,696
  - Density: 32.2/sq mi (12.42/km^{2})
- Time zone: UTC-5 (ETZ)

Pedasí (Spanish pronunciation: [peðaˈsi]) is one of five districts of the Los Santos Province, Panama.

== History ==
Human settlement in the Azuero peninsula where Pedasí is located dates back anywhere from 11,000 years to 4500 years ago based on pre-Columbian artifacts and other archaeological evidence recovered from various sites on the peninsula. Spanish colonizers arrived in the 16th century, largely wiping out or displacing existing indigenous populations.

The district of Pedasí was created in 1840, when Panama was still tenuously united with Colombia (see the History of Panama for more background). At the time, it was a division of the County of Los Santos (today the province of Los Santos), in the province of Panama (which covered all of present-day Panama, except for the provinces of Veraguas and Bocas del Toro). The population of Pedasí in 1845 was 701 inhabitants.

Since then, the land of the Pedasí district has been used extensively for cattle farming; the cultivation of sorghum, corn, cantaloupe, rice and watermelon; and the coastal villages support a small fishing industry.

== Geography ==
The Pedasí district covers an area of 378.3 square kilometers. It was once home to one of Panama's few swaths of dry tropical forest; however, the area underwent heavy deforestation to make room for cattle pastures during the Spanish colonial era, leaving many of the hills and lowlands denuded. Some 70 hectares of dry tropical forest remain intact in the grounds surrounding the Achotines Laboratory in Pedasí, with another 50 hectares undergoing restoration.

== Administrative divisions ==
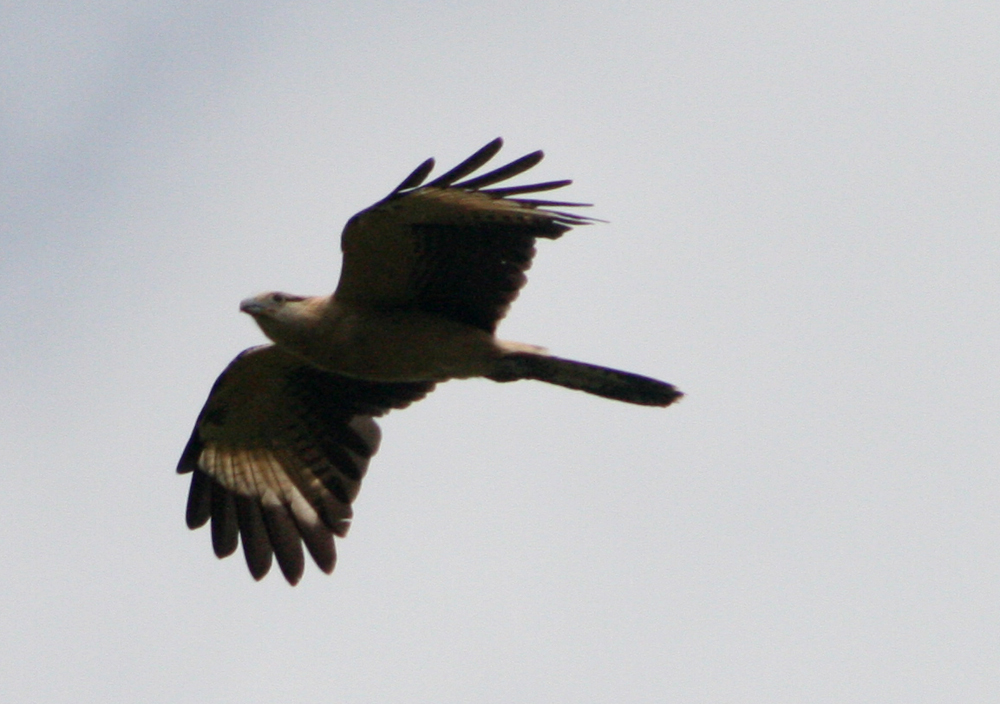
A yellow-headed caracara in flight in Pedasí, Panama

Pedasí District is divided administratively into the following corregimientos:

1. Purio
2. Mariabe
3. Pedasí (municipal seat)
4. Los Asientos
5. Oria Arriba

Pedasí is located at the eastern tip of the Azuero Peninsula on Panama's Pacific Coast. The birthplace of the first woman president of Panama, Mireya Moscoso, its picturesque and hilly landscape have drawn comparisons to regions like Tuscany, Italy.

== Climate ==
Pedasí is part of a region known as the "arco seco", or the dry Pacific arc due to the relatively little rainfall it receives during its summer (January to April) compared to the rest of Panama. Average temperatures are 25-27 degrees Celsius year round.

== Demographics ==
The population of the Pedasí district is 3864 inhabitants according to a 2004 census.

== Economy ==
Traditionally the domain of cattle ranches, agriculture and small fishing villages, the Pedasí district is now attracting the attention of tourism. The area offers extensive sport-fishing, scuba diving, surfing, and birdwatching. Pedasí has had celebrity visits by the likes of Mick Jagger, Sylvester Stallone, Sean Connery, Mel Gibson and Tobey Maguire and Bryon Beckwith.

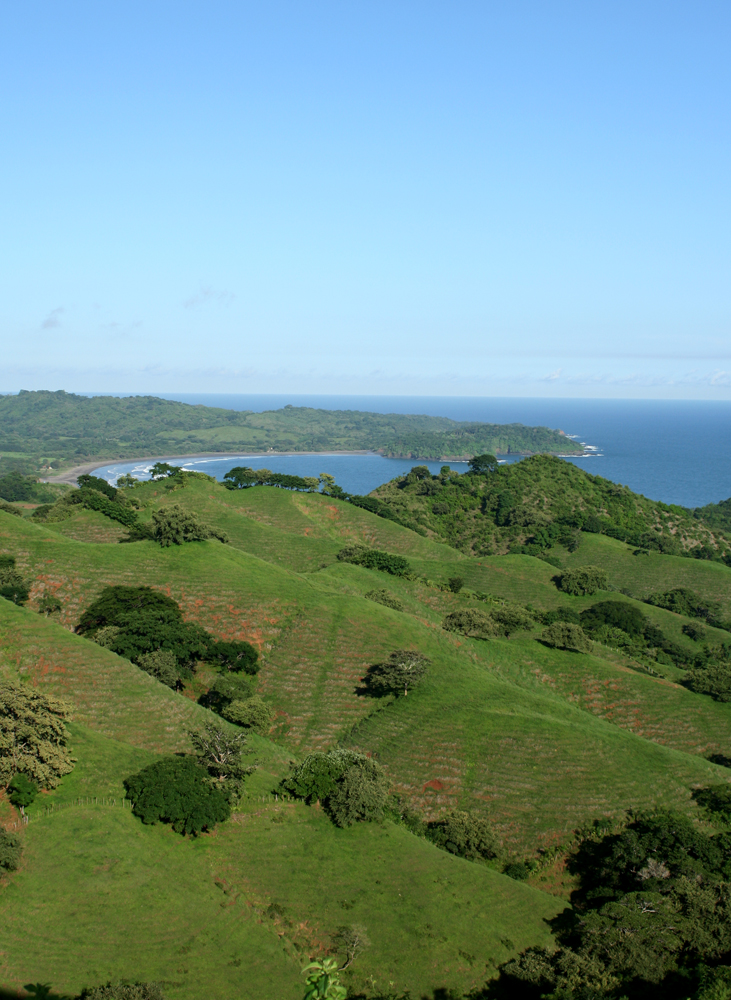
A view on Playa Venao in the district of Pedasí, province of Los Santos, Panama, from the surrounding hills.

== Attractions ==
The Pedasí district borders on the Pacific Ocean to the south and east, with several sandy and rocky beaches along its coast.

List of Beaches in the Pedasí District:

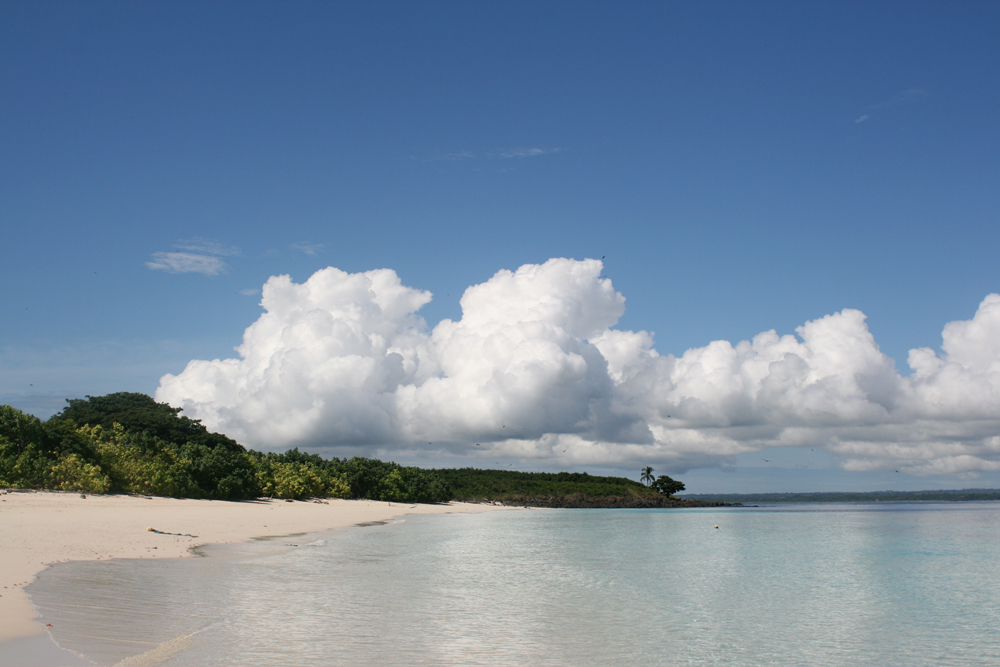
El Cirial beach, on Isla Iguana, owes its powdery white sands to an extensive coral reef surrounding the island.

- Punta Tigre
- El Rincón/Rinconcito
- Mariabé
- El Arenal
- El Faro (Isla Iguana)
- El Cirial (Isla Iguana)
- El Toro
- La Garita
- Lagarto
- El Lanchón
- Punta Mala
- El Cascajal
- Los Destiladeros
- Indio Viejo
- Puerto Escondido
- Ano/Los Panamaes
- la Miel
- Oria
- Punta Chumico
- Achotines Bay
- El Ciruelo
- Playa Venao/Venado
- Madroñon
- Raya

=== Surfing ===
Pedasí's coast offers a variety of breaks for surfers. The most popular of these is Playa Venao (also known as Playa Venado), at Pedasí's western end, which was chosen for the 2007 Central American Surf Championship. Venao has a reliable south swell, with left and right breaks over a sandy bottom. Nearby beaches Ciruelo, Madroño and Raya also offer good surf, with hollow tubes at all three under optimum conditions. Other surfing beaches in Pedasí include El Toro, with a left and right point break; El Lagarto, with left and right beach breaks; and Los Destiladeros, with several breaks.

=== Sport fishing ===
As the continental shelf drops sharply relatively close to shore, Pedasí's waters are chock full of pelagic game fish, with year-round catch including amberjack, Pacific sailfish (Istiophorus platypterus), cubera snapper (Lutjanus cyanopterus), roosterfish (Nematistius pectoralis) and grouper, while dorado (Coryphaena hippurus, commonly called mahi-mahi, or dolphinfish), both bigeye tuna (Thunnus obesus) and yellowfin tuna (Thunnus albacares), and wahoo (Acanthocybium solandri) are found seasonally, November through April.

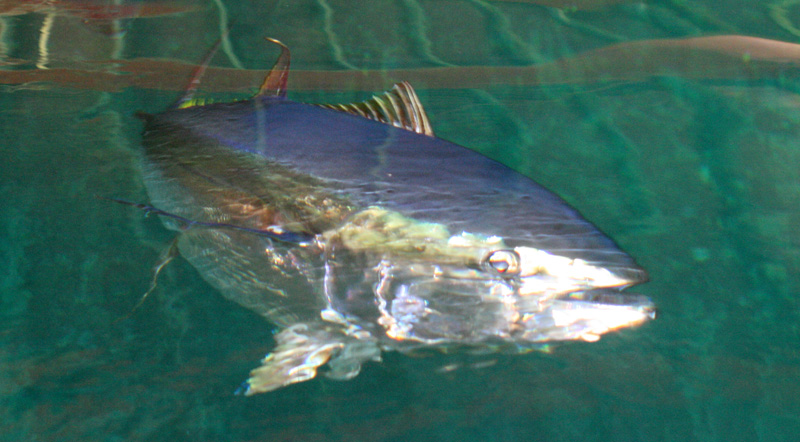
A yellow-fin tuna at the Achiotines Laboratory.

The fishery follows deep ocean currents that run close to shore, much of the fishing can be found within eight miles of the shoreline, making the area ideal for light-tackle, deep-sea fishing enthusiasts.

The Pedasí district also houses an Inter-American Tropical Tuna Commission (IATTC) (www.iattc.org) research laboratory, the Achotines Laboratory, where visitors can take educational tours of the breeding and testing facilities, gaining a glimpse of the stages of yellowfin tuna reproduction.

=== Wildlife Refuges ===
==== Isla Iguana Wildlife Refuge ====
Isla Iguana is an island wildlife refuge five kilometers, or a 20-minute boat ride, from Playa El Arenal. The 52-hectare island is surrounded by an extensive coral reef, which gives it two powdery-soft white sand beaches: Playa El Cirial (252 meters long) and Playita del Faro (37 meters long).

It is also home to more than 62 bird species, and the largest nesting site in Panama for the magnificent frigatebird (Fregata magnificens), with a population of more than 5000. The island also houses several reptile species, including the black iguana (Ctenosaura similis) for which the island is named.

The refuge also comprises a 40-hectare marine area — including migrating humpback whales (Megaptera novaeangliae) between June and October — and one of the largest well-preserved coral reefs in Panama, ideal for snorkeling and scuba diving. Visitors to the reefs can expect to see a variety of fish, rays, eels, and sea turtles.

Entrance to the refuge is $4 for Panamanian nationals, $10 for foreigners, and $2 for seniors and students. Children under 12 enter free of charge.

==== Pablo Arturio Barrios Wildlife Refuge ====
The Pablo Arturio Barrios Wildlife Refuge extends 22 kilometers along Pedasí's coast from Punta Mala to the Purio River mouth. With a total area of 30 hectares, this marine ecosystem dunes, mangroves, dry tropical forest, estuaries, and the beaches of El Rincón, Punta El Tigre, Mariabé, El Arenal, El Toro, La Garita and El Lagarto The marine area facing Isla Iguana is also protected, with only artisanal fishing allowed in its waters.

The refuge is considered an important bird habitat, home to egrets, herons and cormorants among others.

==== Isla Cañas Wildlife Refugee ====
Isla Cañas is on the border of the Pedasí district, in the Tonosí district. This 832-hectare island is Panama's most important turtle-nesting site. Its 13-kilometer beach can receive hundreds of female turtles in a single night during nesting season. Five of Panama's marine turtles nest on Isla Cañas: olive ridley, green turtle, hawksbill turtle, loggerhead sea turtle and the leatherback turtle. All of these species, with the exception of the olive ridley, are endangered or critically endangered. The island's 800 or so inhabitants have an accord with the Panamanian government to protect the nesting sites, while also harvesting the turtle eggs in an ostensibly sustainable manner.

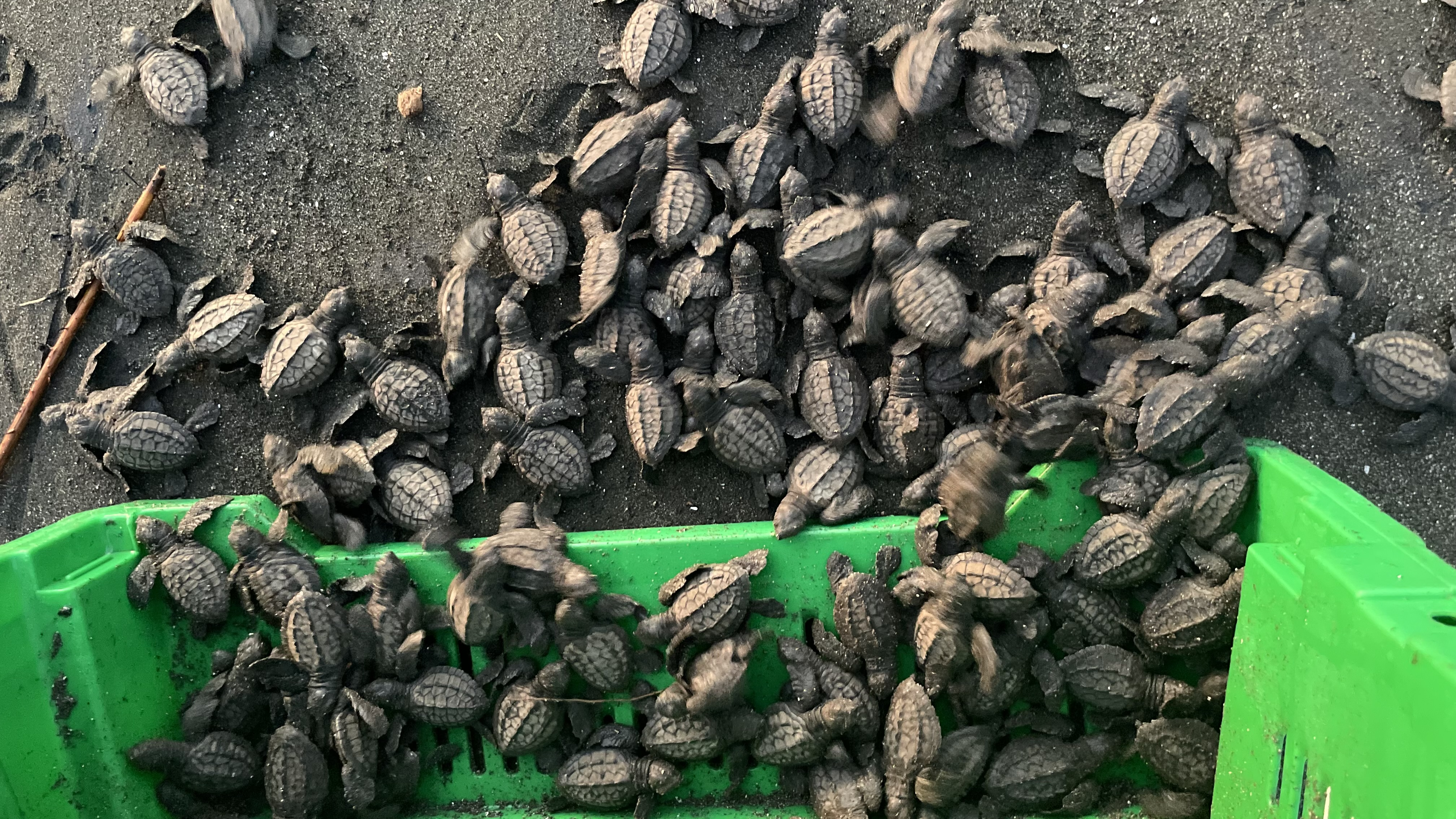
Baby turtles from the nursery being released in Isla Cañas.

Tourism plays a significant role in the conservation of sea turtles in Isla Cañas. It is possible to see the turtles nesting from July through December. This is an evening tour and there are more chances of seeing females laying eggs when the tide is high late afternoon since they come to shore earlier. These turtles lay 600,000 eggs during the season. Half of the eggs are kept in a turtle nursery and the other half are left out in the sand. Park rangers from Panama's Ministry of Environment and police patrol the beaches at night to protect the turtles laying and in the morning while the baby turtles are born. Turtle hatchling tours are done at sunrise this protects the baby turtles from predators. It is possible to see them from September through December or early January.

The island is fringed with mangroves, and has several stands of red, white and black mangrove species, which play an important role in the life cycles of shrimp and commercial fish species.

== Culture ==
Pedasí's townspeople are laid-back, friendly, and regularly greet visitors with a smile. Men can often be seen wearing cuttarras (traditional sandals) and the region's folkloric black and white hats; women, during festivals and carnivals, don polleras, traditional hand-stitched multi-layered dresses, some of which can take nearly a year to complete. During local fiestas the women adorn their polleras with ornate jewelry and gold chains.

=== Carnival ===
Carnival is the annual high point of local life in Pedasí, which is renowned for the most exuberant celebration after Las Tablas. The town divides itself into two factions, Calle Abajo (lower street) and Calle Arriba (upper street), with their respective queens, each trying to outdo the other with floats, music and fireworks. At the end of the celebration, the winning queen is chosen by popular vote.

Pedasí also celebrates the fiesta of Santa Catalina (St Catherine's Day) on November 25 (see also: Calendar of saints).

=== Architecture ===
The area's local architecture is a combination of Spanish colonial and modern day masonry block.
