= New Zealand at the 2018 Commonwealth Games =

- Flag of New Zealand
- CG code: NZL
- CGA: New Zealand Olympic Committee
- Website: www.olympic.org.nz

in Gold Coast, Australia 4 April 2018 – 15 April 2018
- Competitors: 251 in 17 sports
- Flag bearer (opening): Sophie Pascoe
- Flag bearer (closing): Stacey Michelsen
- Officials: Rob Waddell (chef de mission)
- Medals Ranked 5th: Gold 15 Silver 16 Bronze 15 Total 46

Commonwealth Games appearances (overview)
- 1930; 1934; 1938; 1950; 1954; 1958; 1962; 1966; 1970; 1974; 1978; 1982; 1986; 1990; 1994; 1998; 2002; 2006; 2010; 2014; 2018; 2022; 2026; 2030

New Zealand competed at the 2018 Commonwealth Games in Gold Coast, Australia, from 4 to 15 April 2018. It was the nations's 21st appearance at the Commonwealth Games, having competed at every Games since their inception in 1930. The New Zealand team consisted of 251 athletes, 130 men and 121 women, across 17 sports.

The New Zealand team collected 46 medals: 15 gold, 16 silver and 15 bronze, an increase of one medal from the previous games. The medals came across twelve sports. The nation won its first medal in beach volleyball, which was introduced at the Games, and its first gold medal in hockey.

== Medal tables ==
Medal	Name	Sport	Event	Date
Gold	Eddie Dawkins; Ethan Mitchell; Sam Webster	Cycling – Track	Men's team sprint	5 April
Gold	Sam Webster	Cycling – Track	Men's sprint	7 April
Gold	Sophie Pascoe	Swimming	Women's 200 m individual medley SM10	7 April
Gold	Jo Edwards	Lawn bowls	Women's singles	8 April
Gold	Joelle King	Squash	Women's singles	9 April
Gold	Sophie Pascoe	Swimming	Women's 100 m breaststroke SB9	9 April
Gold	David Liti	Weightlifting	Men's +105 kg	9 April
Gold	Tomas Walsh	Athletics	Men's shot put	9 April
Gold	Julia Ratcliffe	Athletics	Women's hammer throw	10 April
Gold	Sam Gaze	Cycling – Mountain bike	Men's cross-country	12 April
Gold	New Zealand women's hockey team (Black Sticks): Sam Charlton; Tarryn Davey; Frances Davies; Madison Doar; Shiloh Gloyn; Ella Gunson; Sam Harrison; Pippa Hayward; Rose Keddell; Anita McLaren; Olivia Merry; Stacey Michelsen; Brooke Neal; Grace O'Hanlon; Amy Robinson; Sally Rutherford; Kelsey Smith; Liz Thompson	Hockey	Women's tournament	14 April
Gold	David Nyika	Boxing	Men's 91 kg	14 April
Gold	Joelle King; Amanda Landers-Murphy	Squash	Women's doubles	15 April
Gold	New Zealand women's rugby sevens team: Shakira Baker; Michaela Blyde; Kelly Brazier; Gayle Broughton; Theresa Fitzpatrick; Sarah Goss; Tyla Nathan-Wong; Alena Saili; Stacey Waaka; Niall Williams; Tenika Willison; Portia Woodman	Rugby sevens	Women's tournament	15 April
Gold	New Zealand men's rugby sevens team: Kurt Baker; Dylan Collier; Scott Curry; Sam Dickson; Trael Joass; Vilimoni Koroi; Andrew Knewstubb; Tim Mikkelson; Sione Molia; Etene Nanai-Seturo; Akuila Rokolisoa; Regan Ware	Rugby sevens	Men's tournament	15 April
Silver	Bryony Botha; Rushlee Buchanan; Kirstie James; Racquel Sheath	Cycling – Track	Women's team pursuit	5 April
Silver	Emma Cumming; Natasha Hansen	Cycling – Track	Women's team sprint	5 April
Silver	Natasha Hansen	Cycling – Track	Women's sprint	6 April
Silver	Campbell Stewart	Cycling – Track	Men's scratch race	7 April
Silver	Alana Barber	Athletics	Women's 20 km walk	8 April
Silver	Eddie Dawkins	Cycling – Track	Men's 1 km time trial	8 April
Silver	Campbell Stewart	Cycling – Track	Men's points race	8 April
Silver	Holly Robinson	Athletics	Women's javelin throw F46	9 April
Silver	Paul Coll	Squash	Men's singles	9 April
Silver	Linda Villumsen	Cycling – Road	Women's time trial	10 April
Silver	Mark Noble; Bruce Wakefield; Barry Wynks	Lawn bowls	Open para triples	12 April
Silver	Anton Cooper	Cycling – Mountain bike	Men's cross-country	12 April
Silver	Valerie Adams	Athletics	Women's shot put	13 April
Silver	Eliza McCartney	Athletics	Women's pole vault	13 April
Silver	Georgia Williams	Cycling – Road	Women's road race	14 April
Silver	New Zealand men's hockey team (Black Sticks): Cory Bennett; Marcus Child; Hugo Inglis; Stephen Jenness; Richard Joyce; Dane Lett; Devon Manchester; Shea McAleese; Harry Miskimmin; George Muir; Dominic Newman; Arun Panchia; Jared Panchia; Hayden Phillips; Nick Ross; Kane Russell; Aidan Sarikaya; Nic Woods	Hockey	Men's tournament	14 April
Bronze	Dylan Kennett	Cycling – Track	Men's individual pursuit	6 April
Bronze	Eddie Dawkins	Cycling – Track	Men's keirin	6 April
Bronze	Lewis Clareburt	Swimming	Men's 400 m individual medley	6 April
Bronze	Andrea Hewitt; Tayler Reid; Ryan Sissons; Nicole van der Kaay	Triathlon	Mixed relay	7 April
Bronze	Emma Cumming	Cycling – Track	Women's 500 m time trial	7 April
Bronze	Natasha Hansen	Cycling – Track	Women's keirin	8 April
Bronze	Hamish Bond	Cycling – Road	Men's time trial	10 April
Bronze	Tasmyn Benny	Boxing	Women's 48 kg	11 April
Bronze	Ben O'Dea; Sam O'Dea	Beach volleyball	Men's tournament	12 April
Bronze	Alexis Pritchard	Boxing	Women's 57 kg	13 April
Bronze	Troy Garton	Boxing	Women's 60 kg	13 April
Bronze	Patrick Mailata	Boxing	Men's +91 kg	13 April
Bronze	Paul Coll; Joelle King	Squash	Mixed doubles	14 April
Bronze	New Zealand women's basketball team (Tall Ferns): Jessica Bygate; Micaela Cocks; Antonia Farnworth; Deena Franklin; Jordan Hunter; Zara Jillings; Charlisse Leger-Walker; Chevannah Paalvast; Kalani Purcell; Erin Rooney; Josephine Stockill; Natalie Taylor	Basketball	Women's tournament	14 April
Bronze	New Zealand men's basketball team (Tall Blacks): Tom Abercrombie; Finn Delany; Shea Ili; Jarrod Kenny; Rob Loe; Jordan Ngatai; Alex Pledger; Derone Raukawa; Ethan Rusbatch; Tohi Smith-Milner; Reuben Te Rangi; Mika Vukona	Basketball	Men's tournament	15 April

Medals by sport
Sport	Gold medal	Silver medal	Bronze medal	Total
Cycling	3	9	5	17
Athletics	2	4	0	6
Squash	2	1	1	4
Swimming	2	0	1	3
Rugby sevens	2	0	0	2
Hockey	1	1	0	2
Lawn bowls	1	1	0	2
Boxing	1	0	4	5
Weightlifting	1	0	0	1
Basketball	0	0	2	2
Beach volleyball	0	0	1	1
Triathlon	0	0	1	1
Total	15	16	15	46

Medals by date
Date	Gold medal	Silver medal	Bronze medal	Total
5 April	1	2	0	3
6 April	0	1	3	4
7 April	2	1	2	5
8 April	1	3	1	5
9 April	4	2	0	6
10 April	1	1	1	3
11 April	0	0	1	1
12 April	1	2	1	4
13 April	0	2	3	5
14 April	2	2	2	6
15 April	3	0	1	2
Total	15	16	15	46

Medals by gender
Gender	Gold medal	Silver medal	Bronze medal	Total
Male	7	6	7	20
Female	8	9	6	23
Mixed / open	0	1	2	3
Total	15	16	15	46

== Competitors ==
The following is the list of number of competitors participating at the Games per sport/discipline.

Sport	Men	Women	Total
Athletics	8	9	17
Badminton	1	1	2
Basketball	12	12	24
Beach volleyball	2	2	4
Boxing	5	3	8
Cycling	20	14	34
Diving	2	3	5
Gymnastics	5	2	7
Hockey	18	18	36
Lawn bowls	10	7	17
Netball	—N/a	12	12
Rugby sevens	13	13	26
Shooting	7	4	11
Squash	5	2	7
Swimming	9	8	17
Triathlon	3	3	6
Weightlifting	6	6	12
Wrestling	4	2	6
Total	130	121	251

== Athletics ==
The NZOC announced fifteen athletes to compete at the games on 2 February 2018. Para-athlete Holly Robinson had been confirmed on 22 November 2017. Brothers Jake and Zane Robertson were added on 9 February 2018. Sprinter Joseph Millar was added on 23 February 2018. Siositina Hakeai was conditionally added on 28 February 2018. Zane Robertson withdrew from the team on 5 April 2018.

Men
Track & road

Athlete	Event	Heat		Semifinal		Final	
Athlete	Event	Result	Rank	Result	Rank	Result	Rank
Joseph Millar	200 m	21.10	23 Q	21.01	16	did not advance	
Cameron French	400 m hurdles	50.60	14	did not advance			
Brad Mathas	800 m	1:46.32	5 q	—N/a		1:46.07	5
Jake Robertson	10000 m	—N/a				27:30.90 NR	5
Quentin Rew	20 km walk	—N/a				1:13:22	5

Field

Athlete(s)	Event	Qualifying		Final	
Athlete(s)	Event	Result	Rank	Result	Rank
Ben Langton Burnell	Javelin throw	75.29	9 q	73.77	10
Nick Southgate	Pole vault	—N/a		NH	
Tom Walsh	Shot put	22.45 GR	1 Q	21.41	1st place, gold medalist(s)

Women
Track & road

Athlete	Event	Heat		Final	
Athlete	Event	Result	Rank	Result	Rank
Angie Petty	800 m	2:00.62	7	did not advance	
Camille Buscomb	5000 m	—N/a		15:55.45	12
Camille Buscomb	10000 m	—N/a		32:23.91	14
Alana Barber	20 km walk	—N/a		1:34:18	2nd place, silver medalist(s)

Field

Athlete(s)	Event	Qualifying		Final	
Athlete(s)	Event	Result	Rank	Result	Rank
Valerie Adams	Shot put	18.52	1 Q	18.70	2nd place, silver medalist(s)
Siositina Hakeai	Discus throw	—N/a		57.16	4
Eliza McCartney	Pole vault	—N/a		4.70	2nd place, silver medalist(s)
Olivia McTaggart	Pole vault	—N/a		4.30	9
Julia Ratcliffe	Hammer throw	—N/a		69.94	1st place, gold medalist(s)
Holly Robinson	Javelin throw F46 (para)	—N/a		43.32	2nd place, silver medalist(s)

== Badminton ==
Two badminton player were announced to compete at the games on 31 January 2018:

Athlete	Event	Round of 64	Round of 32	Round of 16	Quarterfinal	Semifinal	Final / BM	
Athlete	Event	Opposition Score	Opposition Score	Opposition Score	Opposition Score	Opposition Score	Opposition Score	Rank
Susannah Leydon-Davis; Oliver Leydon-Davis	Mixed doubles	Bye	McNee & Bailey (JAM); W 2 – 1	Ellis & Smith (ENG); L 0 – 2	did not advance			

== Basketball ==
New Zealand has qualified a men's and women's basketball teams for a total of 24 athletes (12 men and 12 women). The men's team qualified as being one of the top three teams in the Commonwealth (besides the host nation, Australia), while the women's team was invited by FIBA and the CGF.

=== Men's tournament ===
Roster

- Tom Abercrombie
- Finn Delany
- Shea Ili
- Jarrod Kenny
- Rob Loe
- Jordan Ngatai
- Alex Pledger
- Derone Raukawa
- Ethan Rusbatch
- Tohi Smith-Milner
- Reuben Te Rangi
- Mika Vukona (c)

Pool A

Team	Pld	W	L	PF	PA	PD	Pts	Qualification
Australia	3	3	0	271	183	+88	6	Semifinals
New Zealand	3	2	1	265	204	+61	5	Semifinals
Canada	3	1	2	197	244	−47	4	Qualifying finals
Nigeria	3	0	3	187	289	−102	3	Qualifying finals

6 April 2018
20:00

Boxscore

Nigeria	65–110	New Zealand
Scoring by quarter: 15–24, 20–26, 8–31, 22–29
Pts: Dike 15; Rebs: Achiuwa 8 Asts: Ofoegbu, Achiuwa 2		Pts: Abercrombie 21; Rebs: Pledger 10; Asts: Ili, Kenny 6

Cairns Convention Centre, Cairns
Referees: Liszka (POL), Kom Njilo (CMR),
Unsworth (GBR)

7 April 2018
21:00

Boxscore

New Zealand	73–79	Australia
Scoring by quarter: 21–19, 19–16, 19-21, 14-23
Pts: Ili 22; Rebs: Delany 6 Asts: Ili 4		Pts: Kay 21; Rebs: Sobey 6 Asts: Cadee 3

Cairns Convention Centre, Cairns
Referees: Bermudez (MEX), Liszka (POL),
Dodds (GBR)

9 April 2018
18:30

Boxscore

Canada	60–82	New Zealand
Scoring by quarter: 14–20, 17–20, 12–23, 17–19
Pts: Kapinga 19; Rebs: Morgan 6 Asts: Diawara, Kapinga 2		Pts: Abercrombie 17; Rebs: Abercrombie 9 Asts: Ili 5

Cairns Convention Centre, Cairns
Referees: Bermudez (MEX), Boyer (AUS),
Decastro (MOZ)

Semifinal

14 April 2018
12:30

Boxscore

New Zealand	86–88	Canada
Scoring by quarter: 16–22, 26–23, 16–30, 28–13
Pts: Ili 23; Rebs: Mika Vukona 15; Asts: Ili 7		Pts: Diressa 22; Rebs: Pierre-Charles 7 Asts: Tutu 6

Gold Coast Convention and Exhibition Centre, Gold Coast
Referees: Liszka (POL), Kato (JPN),
Kom Njilo (CMR)

Bronze medal match

15 April 2018
09:00

Boxscore

Scotland	69–79	New Zealand
Scoring by quarter: 21–19, 14–22, 9–18, 25–20
Pts: Bunyan 13; Rebs: Fraser 6 Asts: Bunyan 5		Pts: Abercrombie 26; Rebs: Loe 10; Asts: Loe 4

Gold Coast Convention and Exhibition Centre, Gold Coast
Referees: Beattie (USA), Weiland (CAN),
Boyer (AUS)

=== Women's tournament ===
Roster

The following is the New Zealand roster in the women's basketball tournament of the 2018 Commonwealth Games.

New Zealand women's national basketball team - 2018 Commonwealth Games roster
Players
Coaches

Pos.	No.	Name	Age – Date of birth	Height	Club	Ctr.
G	0	Zara Jillings	19 – 30 May 1998	1.75 m (5 ft 9 in)	Fordham Rams	(United States)
G	1	Erin Rooney	27 – 3 September 1990	1.73 m (5 ft 8 in)	BBC Troistorrents	(Switzerland)
G	2	Micaela Cocks	31 – 2 May 1986	1.74 m (5 ft 9 in)	Townsville Fire	(Australia)
F	4	Kalani Purcell	23 – 13 January 1995	1.84 m (6 ft 0 in)	Melbourne Boomers	(Australia)
G	6	Jordan Hunter	27 – 20 August 1990	1.68 m (5 ft 6 in)	Sturt Sabres	(Australia)
G	7	Antonia Farnworth	30 – 10 May 1987	1.81 m (5 ft 11 in)	Perth Lynx	(Australia)
F	8	Natalie Taylor	35 – 24 December 1982	1.83 m (6 ft 0 in)	Brisbane Spartans	(Australia)
G/F	10	Chevannah Paalvast	26 – 4 September 1991	1.80 m (5 ft 11 in)	Canberra Capitals	(Australia)
F	11	Jessica Bygate	26 – 10 January 1992	1.85 m (6 ft 1 in)	Sandringham Sabres	(Australia)
C	13	Josephine Stockill	24 – 29 December 1993	1.86 m (6 ft 1 in)	Sunbury Jets	(Australia)
F	15	Deena Franklin	23 – 5 February 1995	1.86 m (6 ft 1 in)	Harbour Breeze	(New Zealand)
G	55	Charlisse Leger-Walker	16 – 15 September 2001	1.74 m (5 ft 9 in)	Waikato Wizards	(New Zealand)

Head coach

- (Australia) Guy Molloy

Assistant coach(es)

- (New Zealand) Jody Cameron
- (New Zealand) Aik Ho

Legend

- (C) Team captain
- Club - describes last
  club before the tournament
- Age - describes age
  on 5 April 2018

Pool B

Pos	Team	Pld	W	L	PF	PA	PD	Pts	Qualification
1	New Zealand	3	3	0	256	148	+108	6	Qualifying finals
2	Jamaica	3	2	1	196	195	+1	5	Qualifying finals
3	Malaysia	3	1	2	187	239	−52	4	
4	India	3	0	3	184	241	−57	3	

Source: GC2018
Rules for classification: 1) Points; 2) Head-to-head results; 3) Points difference; 4) Points scored.

5 April 2018
21:00

Boxscore

New Zealand	86–44	Malaysia
Scoring by quarter: 24–10, 27–15, 15–3, 20–16
Pts: Cocks 15; Rebs: Purcell 12; Asts: Hunter 6		Pts: Yap 12; Rebs: Pang 7 Asts: Pang 5

Cairns Convention Centre, Cairns
Referees: James Boyer (AUS), Sarah Carey (AUS), Kate Webb (ENG)

7 April 2018
11:30

Boxscore

New Zealand	80–49	Jamaica
Scoring by quarter: 17–16, 24–9, 19–14, 20–10
Pts: Leger-Walker 18; Rebs: Leger-Walker 6 Asts: Cocks 6		Pts: George 12; Rebs: Jackson 7 Asts: L. Gordon, Jackson 2

Cairns Convention Centre, Cairns
Referees: Christine Vuong (CAN), Ceciline Michael Vincent (IND), Artur Decastro (MOZ)

8 April 2018
17:30

Boxscore

India	55–90	New Zealand
Scoring by quarter: 12–31, 10–23, 19–19, 14–17
Pts: Kumari 14; Rebs: Skaria 9 Asts: Limaye, Sidhu 3		Pts: Cocks 21; Rebs: Farnworth 7 Asts: Farnworth 5

Cairns Convention Centre, Cairns
Referees: James Boyer (AUS), Christine Vuong (CAN), Simon Unsworth (ENG)

Qualifying final

10 April 2018
21:00

Boxscore

Mozambique	63–79	New Zealand
Scoring by quarter: 7–18, 19–23, 15–19, 22–19
Pts: Mafanela 15; Rebs: Lhavanguane, Mucauro 7 Asts: Cossa, Mucauro 5		Pts: Taylor 25; Rebs: Taylor 8 Asts: Hunter 7

Townsville Entertainment and Convention Centre, Townsville
Referees: Takaki Kato (JPN), Jon Chapman (AUS), Joyce Muchenu (ZIM)

Semifinal

13 April 2018
21:00

Boxscore

Australia	109–50	New Zealand
Scoring by quarter: 25–12, 28–16, 30–6, 26–16
Pts: Cambage 21; Rebs: Griffin, Kunek 7 Asts: O'Hea 6		Pts: three players 9 Rebs: Paalvast 5 Asts: Cocks, Purcell 3

Gold Coast Convention and Exhibition Centre, Gold Coast
Referees: Wojciech Liszka (POL), Viola Gyoergyi (NOR), Chris Dodds (GBR)

Bronze medal match

14 April 2018
18:00

Boxscore

New Zealand	74–58	Canada
Scoring by quarter: 16–12, 18–14, 23–13, 17–19
Pts: Leger-Walker, Taylor 18; Rebs: Purcell 7 Asts: Cocks 7		Pts: Nofuente 18; Rebs: three players 6 Asts: Masikewich, Traer 2

Gold Coast Convention and Exhibition Centre, Gold Coast
Referees: Jon Chapman (AUS), Sarah Carey (AUS), Kate Webb (ENG)

== Beach volleyball ==
The women's pair was named on 10 January 2018. The men's pair was added on 20 February 2018.

Athlete	Event	Preliminary round	Standing	Quarterfinals	Semifinals	Final / BM	
Athlete	Event	Opposition Score	Standing	Opposition Score	Opposition Score	Opposition Score	Rank
Ben O'Dea; Sam O'Dea	Men's	Pool C Apostolou – Chrysostomou (CYP); W 2 – 1 Acacio – Soares (MOZ); W 2 – 1 Gregory – Sheaf (ENG); W 2 – 1	1	Stewart – Williams (TTO); W 2 – 0	Pedlow – Schachter (CAN); L 0 – 2	Gregory – Sheaf (ENG); W 2 – 0	3rd place, bronze medalist(s)
Kelsie Wills; Shaunna Polley	Women's	Pool C Nzayisenga – Mutatsimpundu (RWA); W 2 – 0 Lau – Ong (SGP); W 2 – 0 Matauatu – Pata (VAN); W 2 – 0	1	Angelopoulou – Konstantinou (CYP); L 0 – 2	did not advance		

== Boxing ==
The eight-member boxing team was announced on 22 February 2018.

Men

Athlete	Event	Round of 32	Round of 16	Quarterfinals	Semifinals	Final	
Athlete	Event	Opposition Result	Opposition Result	Opposition Result	Opposition Result	Opposition Result	Rank
Richard Hadlow	64 kg	Volcere (SEY); W 4 – 1	Vidanalage (SRI); L 1 – 4	did not advance			
Leroy Hindley	69 kg	Katta (SLE); W 5 – 0	Moshoeshoe (LES); W 4 – 1	Walsh (NIR); L 0 – 5	did not advance		
Ryan Scaife	75 kg	Bye	Owuor (KEN); W 5 – 0	Ntsengue (CMR); L 0 – 5	did not advance		
David Nyika	91 kg	—N/a	Aska (ANT); W 5 – 0	Ndzie Tsoye (CMR); W W/O	Clarke (ENG); W 5 – 0	Whateley (AUS); W 5 – 0	1st place, gold medalist(s)
Patrick Mailata	91 kg+	—N/a	Barton (SCO); W 5 – 0	McMonagle (NIR); W 5 – 0	Clarke (ENG); L 2 – 3	Did not advance	3rd place, bronze medalist(s)

Women

Athlete	Event	Round of 16	Quarterfinals	Semifinals	Final	
Athlete	Event	Opposition Result	Opposition Result	Opposition Result	Opposition Result	Rank
Tasmyn Benny	48 kg	—N/a	Modukanele (BOT); W 5 – 0	O'Hara (NIR); L 0 – 5	Did not advance	3rd place, bronze medalist(s)
Alexis Pritchard	57 kg	Ranone (LES); W RSC	Hansika (SRI); W 5 – 0	Walsh (NIR); L 1 – 4	Did not advance	3rd place, bronze medalist(s)
Troy Garton	60 kg	Bye	Kasemang (BOT); W 5 – 0	Stridsman (AUS); L 0 – 5	Did not advance	3rd place, bronze medalist(s)

== Cycling ==
The team of 33 cyclists was named on 17 February 2018. Jason Christie replaced Alex Frame, and Hayden McCormick replaced Hamish Bond in the road race, leaving Bond to focus solely on the time trial, on 22 March 2018.

=== Road ===
Men

Athlete	Event	Time	Rank
Shane Archbold	Road race	3:57:01	6
Jack Bauer	Road race	3:57:22	13
Jason Christie	Road race	3:57:58	16
Sam Gaze	Road race	3:57:04	10
Hayden McCormick	Road race	3:57:01	5
James Oram	Road race	3:57:10	11
Hamish Bond	Time trial	48:45.45	3rd place, bronze medalist(s)
James Oram	Time trial	49:40.72	5

Women

Athlete	Event	Time	Rank
Bryony Botha	Road race	DNF	
Rushlee Buchanan	Road race	3:05:40	26
Sharlotte Lucas	Road race	3:02:18	4
Kate McIlroy	Road race	3:03:32	19
Linda Villumsen	Road race	3:02:43	12
Georgia Williams	Road race	3:02:18	2nd place, silver medalist(s)
Rushlee Buchanan	Time trial	37:39.28	5
Linda Villumsen	Time trial	36:03.01	2nd place, silver medalist(s)

=== Track ===
Sprint

Athlete	Event	Qualification		Round 1	Quarterfinals	Semifinals	Final	
Athlete	Event	Time	Rank	Opposition Time	Opposition Time	Opposition Time	Opposition Time	Rank
Eddie Dawkins	Men's sprint	9.704	7 Q	Truman (ENG); L 10.222	did not advance			
Ethan Mitchell	Men's sprint	9.654	3 Q	Constable (AUS); W 10.518	Schmid (AUS); L, L	did not advance		
Sam Webster	Men's sprint	9.809	12 Q	Hindes (ENG); W 10.167	Owens (ENG); W 10.250, W 10.188	Sahrom (MAS); W 10.334, W 10.151	Carlin (SCO); W 10.123, W 9.952	1st place, gold medalist(s)
Eddie Dawkins; Ethan Mitchell; Sam Webster	Men's team sprint	42.822 GR	1 Q	—N/a			England; W 42.877	1st place, gold medalist(s)
Emma Cumming	Women's sprint	11.079	8 Q	Stewart (NIR); W 11.800	Morton (AUS); L, L	did not advance		
Natasha Hansen	Women's sprint	10.760	3 Q	Coster (WAL); W 11.389	Mustapa (MAS); W 11.242, W 11.670	Genest (CAN); W 11.317, L, W 11.672	Morton (AUS); L, L	2nd place, silver medalist(s)
Olivia Podmore	Women's sprint	10.985	5 Q	Walsh (CAN); W 11.769	McCulloch (AUS); L, L	did not advance		
Emma Cumming; Natasha Hansen	Women's team sprint	33.321	2 Q	—N/a			Australia; L 33.115	2nd place, silver medalist(s)

Keirin

Athlete	Event	Round 1	Repechage	Semifinals	Final
Eddie Dawkins	Men's keirin	3	1 Q	3 Q	3rd place, bronze medalist(s)
Bradly Knipe	Men's keirin	6	4	Did not advance	
Sam Webster	Men's keirin	2 Q	—N/a	1 Q	5
Emma Cumming	Women's keirin	3	3 Q	4	11
Natasha Hansen	Women's keirin	1 Q	—N/a	2 Q	3rd place, bronze medalist(s)
Olivia Podmore	Women's keirin	5	1 Q	2 Q	6

Time trial

Athlete	Event	Time	Rank
Eddie Dawkins	Men's time trial	59.928	2nd place, silver medalist(s)
Dylan Kennett	Men's time trial	1:01.546	7
Zac Williams	Men's time trial	1:01.132	4
Ellesse Andrews	Women's time trial	35.850	12
Emma Cumming	Women's time trial	34.230	3rd place, bronze medalist(s)
Natasha Hansen	Women's time trial	34.238	4

Pursuit

Athlete	Event	Qualification		Final	
Athlete	Event	Time	Rank	Opponent Results	Rank
Jared Gray	Men's pursuit	4:22.752	12	did not advance	
Dylan Kennett	Men's pursuit	4:13.414	3 QB	Kerby (AUS); W 4:18.373	3rd place, bronze medalist(s)
Nick Kergozou	Men's pursuit	4:23.429	13	did not advance	
Regan Gough; Nick Kergozou; Tom Sexton; Campbell Stewart	Men's team pursuit	DSQ		did not advance	
Ellesse Andrews	Women's pursuit	3:33.707	6	did not advance	
Bryony Botha	Women's pursuit	3:35.394	9	did not advance	
Kirstie James	Women's pursuit	3:29.192	5	did not advance	
Bryony Botha; Rushlee Buchanan; Kirstie James; Racquel Sheath	Women's team pursuit	4:22.331	2 Q	Australia; L OVL	2nd place, silver medalist(s)

Points race

Athlete	Event	Qualification		Final	
Athlete	Event	Points	Rank	Points	Rank
Regan Gough	Men's point race	28	2 Q	43	9
Campbell Stewart	Men's point race	9	9 Q	69	2nd place, silver medalist(s)
Tom Sexton	Men's point race	12	4 Q	43	10
Rushlee Buchanan	Women's points race	—N/a		10	5
Michaela Drummond	Women's points race	—N/a		4	10
Racquel Sheath	Women's points race	—N/a		0	17

Scratch race

Athlete	Event	Qualification	Final
Dylan Kennett	Men's scratch race	7 Q	15
Nick Kergozou	Men's scratch race	6 Q	17
Campbell Stewart	Men's scratch race	6 Q	2nd place, silver medalist(s)
Michaela Drummond	Women's scratch race	—N/a	10
Kirstie James	Women's scratch race	—N/a	5
Racquel Sheath	Women's scratch race	—N/a	15

=== Mountain bike ===
Athlete	Event	Time	Rank
Anton Cooper	Men's cross-country	1:17:36	2nd place, silver medalist(s)
Sam Gaze	Men's cross-country	1:17:36	1st place, gold medalist(s)
Ben Oliver	Men's cross-country	1:18:41	4
Samara Sheppard	Women's cross-country	1:23:46	9

== Diving ==
New Zealand participated with a team of five athletes: two men and three women. Two divers were among selections announced on 22 December 2017, and three further divers were added to the squad on 16 February 2018.

Men

Athlete	Event	Preliminaries		Final	
Athlete	Event	Points	Rank	Points	Rank
Liam Stone	1 m springboard	255.90	13	did not advance	
Liam Stone	3 m springboard	325.95	15	did not advance	
Anton Down-Jenkins	3 m springboard	326.70	14	did not advance	
Anton Down-Jenkins; Liam Stone	3 m synchronised springboard	—N/a		332.64	8

Women

Athlete	Event	Preliminaries		Final	
Athlete	Event	Points	Rank	Points	Rank
Shaye Boddington	1 m springboard	237.95	9 Q	194.50	12
Elizabeth Cui	1 m springboard	198.80	13	did not advance	
Elizabeth Cui	3 m springboard	241.20	10 Q	247.10	12
Elizabeth Cui; Yu Qian Goh	3 m synchronised springboard	—N/a		251.70	4

== Gymnastics ==
The first five gymnasts were announced on 22 December 2017. An additional two gymnasts were announced on 5 February 2018.

=== Artistic ===
Men
Team Final & Individual Qualification

Athlete	Event	Apparatus						Total	Rank
Athlete	Event	F	PH	R	V	PB	HB	Total	Rank
David Bishop	Team	—N/a	12.500	12.450	13.800	—N/a	12.450	—N/a	
Ethan Dick	Team	13.700 Q	11.800	12.650	14.000	13.350	10.800	76.300	16 Q
Devy Dyson	Team	11.150	10.200	13.825 Q	—N/a	12.800	13.200	—N/a	
Kyleab Ellis	Team	13.100	—N/a	—N/a	14.300 Q	13.225	—N/a	—N/a	
Mikhail Koudinov	Team	13.600	12.350	12.900	13.900	13.750	12.800	79.300	9 Q
Total	Team	40.400	36.650	39.375	42.200	40.325	38.450	237.400	6

Individual Finals

Athlete	Event	Apparatus						Total	Rank
Athlete	Event	F	PH	R	V	PB	HB	Total	Rank
Ethan Dick	All-around	13.600	12.850	12.700	13.900	12.500	12.400	77.950	11
Ethan Dick	Floor	13.500	—N/a					13.500	5
Devy Dyson	Rings	—N/a		13.533	—N/a			13.533	6
Kyleab Ellis	Vault	—N/a			13.933	—N/a		13.933	7
Mikhail Koudinov	All-around	12.200	12.850	13.000	13.600	11.950	11.600	75.200	15

Women
Individual Qualification

Athlete	Event	Apparatus				Total	Rank
Athlete	Event	V	UB	BB	F	Total	Rank
Stella Ashcroft	Qualification	13.100	10.000	11.750	10.875	45.725	14 Q

Individual Finals

Athlete	Event	Apparatus				Total	Rank
Athlete	Event	V	UB	BB	F	Total	Rank
Stella Ashcroft	All-around	12.950	9.900	11.700	11.500	46.050	13

=== Rhythmic ===
Individual Qualification

Athlete	Event	Apparatus				Total	Rank
Athlete	Event	Hoop	Ball	Clubs	Ribbon	Total	Rank
Stella Ebert	Qualification	10.400	7.400	9.300	7.550	34.650	22

== Hockey ==
New Zealand has qualified both men's and women's hockey teams for a total of 36 athletes (18 men and 18 women). Both teams qualified as being one of the top nine teams in the Commonwealth (besides the host nation, Australia) according to their FIH World Rankings as of 31 October 2017.

=== Men's tournament ===
Roster

- Cory Bennett
- Marcus Child
- Hugo Inglis
- Stephen Jenness
- Richard Joyce
- Dane Lett
- Devon Manchester
- Shea McAleese
- Harry Miskimmin
- George Muir
- Dominic Newman
- Arun Panchia (c)
- Jared Panchia
- Hayden Phillips
- Nick Ross
- Kane Russell
- Aidan Sarikaya
- Nic Woods

Pool A

Pos	Team	Pld	W	D	L	GF	GA	GD	Pts	Qualification
1	Australia (H)	4	4	0	0	16	2	+14	12	Advance to Semi-finals
2	New Zealand	4	3	0	1	18	6	+12	9	Advance to Semi-finals
3	Scotland	4	1	0	3	7	14	−7	3	5th–6th place match
4	Canada	4	1	0	3	3	12	−9	3	7th–8th place match
5	South Africa	4	1	0	3	4	14	−10	3	9th–10th place match

Source: FIH
Rules for classification: 1) points; 2) number of wins; 3) goal difference; 4) goals scored; 5) head-to-head results.
(H) Hosts

6 April 2018
11:30

New Zealand	6–2	Canada
Russell 28'; Woods 31'; Muir 41'; Lett 42'; Jenness 42'; Inglis 60'	Report	Kirkpatrick 47'; Johnston 58'

Umpires:
Hong Zhen Lim (SGP)
Paul Walker (GBR)

8 April 2018
16:30

New Zealand	6–0	South Africa
Russell 4', 25'; J. Panchia 26'; Woods 27'; Muir 50'; Ross 53'	Report

Umpires:
Jamie Hooper (WAL)
Paul Walker (ENG)

10 April 2018
11:30

New Zealand	5–2	Scotland
Russell 3', 30', 34'; J. Panchia 4'; Inglis 50'	Report	Forsyth 20', 53'

Umpires:
Anbananthan Rawi (MAS)
Deepak Joshi (IND)

11 April 2018
16:30

Australia	2–1	New Zealand
Whetton 20'; Mitton 57'	Report	Bennett 59'

Umpires:
David Sweetman (SCO)
Hong Zhen Lim (SGP)

Semifinal

13 April 2018
21:45

India	2–3	New Zealand
H. Singh 30', 56'	Report	Inglis 7'; Jenness 13'; Child 40'

Umpires:
Lim Hong Zhen (SGP)
Rawi Anbananthan (MAS)

Gold medal match

14 April 2018
21:15

Australia	2–0	New Zealand
Kleinschmidt 21'; Dawson 28'	Report

Umpires:
Sean Rapaport (RSA)
Lim Hong Zhen (SGP)

=== Women's tournament ===
Roster

- Sam Charlton
- Tarryn Davey
- Frances Davies
- Madison Doar
- Shiloh Gloyn
- Ella Gunson
- Sam Harrison
- Pippa Hayward
- Rose Keddell
- Anita McLaren
- Olivia Merry
- Stacey Michelsen (c)
- Brooke Neal
- Grace O'Hanlon
- Amy Robinson
- Sally Rutherford
- Kelsey Smith
- Liz Thompson

Pool B

Pos	Team	Pld	W	D	L	GF	GA	GD	Pts	Qualification
1	Australia (H)	4	3	1	0	8	0	+8	10	Advance to Semi-finals
2	New Zealand	4	2	2	0	18	1	+17	8	Advance to Semi-finals
3	Canada	4	1	2	1	5	2	+3	5	5th–6th place match
4	Scotland	4	1	1	2	6	8	−2	4	7th–8th place match
5	Ghana	4	0	0	4	1	27	−26	0	9th–10th place match

Source: FIH
Rules for classification: 1) points; 2) number of wins; 3) goal difference; 4) goals scored; 5) head-to-head results.
(H) Hosts

5 April 2018
11:30

Scotland	1–6	New Zealand
Howie 53'	Report	Smith 10'; Neal 12'; Gloyn 18', 48'; Keddell 18', 45'

Umpires:
Ayanna McClean (USA)
Cookie Tan (SGP)

6 April 2018
16:30

New Zealand	12–0	Ghana
Doar 10', 50', 53'; Smith 14'; Charlton 16'; Gloyn 28'; Michelsen 33'; Merry 35'; Harrison 43'; McLaren 49', 59'; Robinson 51'	Report

Umpires:
Catherine Wright (GBR)
Aleisha Neumann (AUS)

8 April 2018
11:30

New Zealand	0–0	Canada
	Report

Umpires:
Wanri Venter (RSA)
Nur Hafiza Azman (MAS)

9 April 2018
21:30

Australia	0–0	New Zealand
	Report

Umpires:
Sarah Wilson (SCO)
Ayanna McClean (TTO)

Semifinal

12 April 2018
19:00

England	0–0	New Zealand
	Report
Penalties
Danson (penalty shoot-out missed); Bray (penalty shoot-out missed); Martin (penalty shoot-out scored); Toman (penalty shoot-out missed); Pearne-Webb (penalty shoot-out missed)	1–2	(penalty shoot-out missed) Charlton; (penalty shoot-out missed) Thompson; (penalty shoot-out scored) Harrison; (penalty shoot-out missed) Gunson; (penalty shoot-out scored) Michelsen

Umpires:
Sarah Wilson (SCO)
Aleisha Neumann (AUS)

Gold medal match

14 April 2018
12:45

New Zealand	4–1	Australia
Gloyn 28'; Keddell 34'; Merry 42'; McLaren 56'	Report	Kenny 50'

Umpires:
Sarah Wilson (SCO)
Ayanna McClean (TTO)

== Lawn bowls ==
The NZOC named seven para-bowlers to compete at the games on 22 November 2017. with the ten able-bodied bowlers named in January 2018.

Men

Athlete	Event	Preliminary round						Quarterfinals	Semifinals	Final/BM	Rank
Athlete	Event	Match 1	Match 2	Match 3	Match 4	Match 5	Rank	Quarterfinals	Semifinals	Final/BM	Rank
Athlete	Event	Opposition Score	Opposition Score	Opposition Score	Opposition Score	Opposition Score	Rank	Opposition Score	Opposition Score	Opposition Score	Rank
Shannon McIlroy	Singles	Newell (JAM); W 21 – 0	Kumar (FIJ); W 21 – 15	Kimani (KEN); W 21 – 12	Paxton (ENG); L 18 – 21	Xalxo (IND); W 21 – 0	1 Q	Paxton (ENG); L 16 – 21	did not advance		
Shannon McIlroy; Blake Signal	Pairs	Botswana; W 27 – 8	Papua New Guinea; W 24 – 11	Cook Islands; W 26 – 12	Fiji; W 18 – 11	England; W 14 – 12	1 Q	Wales; L 20 – 7	did not advance		
Ali Forsyth; Paul Girdler; Mike Nagy	Triples	Singapore; W 28 – 6	Niue; W 36 – 8	Canada; W 18 – 13	Namibia; W 28 – 8	—N/a	1 Q	Australia; L 10 – 25	did not advance		
Ali Forsyth; Paul Girdler; Mike Nagy; Blake Signal	Fours	Cook Islands; W 21 – 4	Papua New Guinea; W 20 – 12	Canada; W 21 – 11	Wales; W 11 – 10	—N/a	1 Q	England; L 2 – 20	did not advance		

Women

Athlete	Event	Preliminary round						Quarterfinals	Semifinals	Final/BM	Rank
Athlete	Event	Match 1	Match 2	Match 3	Match 4	Match 5	Rank	Quarterfinals	Semifinals	Final/BM	Rank
Athlete	Event	Opposition Score	Opposition Score	Opposition Score	Opposition Score	Opposition Score	Rank	Opposition Score	Opposition Score	Opposition Score	Rank
Jo Edwards	Singles	Pinki (IND); W 20 – 16	Blumsky (NIU); W 21 – 11	Rednall (ENG); L 17 – 21	Tikoisuva (FIJ); W 21 – 10	Saroji (MAS); W 21 – 7	1 Q	Saroji (MAS); W 21 – 9	Piketh (RSA); W 21 – 17	Daniels (WAL); W 21 – 17	1st place, gold medalist(s)
Jo Edwards; Val Smith	Pairs	Fiji; W 17 – 16	Tonga; W 29 – 6	Canada; L 16 – 18	Norfolk Island; L 11 – 20	—N/a	3	did not advance			
Mandy Boyd; Tayla Bruce; Katelyn Inch	Triples	Zambia; W 24 – 12	Namibia; W 21 – 15	Jersey; W 24 – 8	Wales; W 19 – 15	—N/a	1 Q	Canada; L 16 – 18	did not advance		
Mandy Boyd; Tayla Bruce; Katelyn Inch; Val Smith	Fours	Jersey; W 20 – 15	Zambia; W 21 – 8	Norfolk Island; W 28 – 5	South Africa; L 11 – 16	—N/a	2 Q	South Africa; L 8 – 16	did not advance		

Para

Athlete	Event	Group stage						Semifinal	Final / BM	
Athlete	Event	Opposition Score	Opposition Score	Opposition Score	Opposition Score	Opposition Score	Rank	Opposition Score	Opposition Score	Rank
Sue Curran; Ann Muir (guide); David Stallard; Peter Blick (guide)	Mixed para pairs	Wales; W 14 – 11	South Africa; L 12 – 14	Australia; L 11 – 16	Scotland; L 5 – 23	England; W 16 – 13	5	did not advance		
Mark Noble; Bruce Wakefield; Barry Wynks	Open para triples	Wales; W 26 – 5	England; L 12 – 13	Scotland; W 17 – 9	South Africa; W 19 – 11	Australia; L 11 – 16	3 Q	England; W 18 – 11	Australia; L 14 – 13	2nd place, silver medalist(s)

== Netball ==
New Zealand qualified a netball team by virtue of being ranked in the top 11 (excluding the host nation, Australia) of the INF World Rankings on 1 July 2017. The team was announced on 8 February 2018.

Roster

- Katrina Grant (c)
- Maria Folau (vc)
- Ameliaranne Ekenasio
- Temalisi Fakahokotau
- Shannon Francois
- Kelly Jury
- Grace Kara
- Claire Kersten
- Bailey Mes
- Te Paea Selby-Rickit
- Michaela Sokolich-Beatson
- Samantha Sinclair

Pool B

Pos	Team	Pld	W	D	L	GF	GA	GD	Pts	Qualification
1	England	5	5	0	0	342	202	+140	10	Semi-finals
2	New Zealand	5	3	0	2	292	235	+57	6	Semi-finals
3	Uganda	5	3	0	2	287	248	+39	6	Classification matches
4	Malawi	5	3	0	2	277	284	−7	6	Classification matches
5	Scotland	5	1	0	4	195	289	−94	2	Classification matches
6	Wales	5	0	0	5	215	350	−135	0	Classification matches

Updated to match(es) played on 11 April 2018. Source: GC2018

5 April 2018
18:30

Report
New Zealand
64–51
Uganda

Gold Coast Convention and Exhibition Centre
Umpires: Helen George
Kate Stephenson
Reserve umpire: Gary Burgess
Folau 22/22 (100%)
Ekenasio 19/26 (73%)
Selby-Rickit 13/14 (93%)
Mes 10/17 (59%)

Proscovia 37/42 (88%)
Nanyonga 14/16 (88%)

6 April 2018
13:00

Report
Wales
44–70
New Zealand

Gold Coast Convention and Exhibition Centre
Umpires: Theresa Prince
Jackie Mizon
Reserve umpire: Joshua Bowring
Moseley 21/30 (70%)
Lewis 21/31 (68%)
Llewelyn 1/1 (100%)
Rowe 1/2 (50%)

Selby-Rickit 28/31 (90%)
Folau 19/23 (83%)
Ekenasio 13/17 (76%)
Mes 10/14 (71%)

8 April 2018
18:30

Report
Malawi
57–53
New Zealand

Gold Coast Convention and Exhibition Centre
Umpires: Joshua Bowring
Gary Burgess
Reserve umpire: Theresa Prince
Kumwenda 41/46 (89%)
Chimaliro 16/20 (80%)

Folau 31/39 (79%)
Selby-Rickit 15/17 (88%)
Mes 7/12 (58%)
Ekenasio 0/2 (0%)

9 April 2018
20:30

Report
New Zealand
60–29
Scotland

Gold Coast Convention and Exhibition Centre
Umpires: Kate Stephenson
Michelle Phippard
Reserve umpire: Joshua Bowring
Selby-Rickit 33/37 (89%)
Folau 27/35 (77%)

Goodwin 23/28 (82%)
Gallagher 6/7 (86%)

11 April 2018
09:00

Report
New Zealand
45–54
England

Gold Coast Convention and Exhibition Centre
Umpires: Michelle Phippard
Marc Henning
Reserve umpire: Joshua Bowring
Folau 30/39 (77%)
Selby-Rickit 12/19 (63%)
Mes 3/4 (75%)

Housby 27/32 (84%)
Harten 27/31 (87%)

Semifinal

14 April 2018
17:00

Report
Australia
65–44
New Zealand

Coomera Indoor Sports Centre
Umpires: Gary Burgess
Jackie Mizon
Reserve umpire: Kate Stephenson
Thwaites 24/25 (96%)
Bassett 17/18 (94%)
Pettitt 15/16 (94%)
Wood 9/12 (75%)

Folau 32/41 (78%)
Ekenasio 7/9 (78%)
Selby-Rickit 3/5 (60%)
Mes 2/3 (67%)

Bronze medal match

15 April 2018
11:00

Report
New Zealand
55–60
Jamaica

Coomera Indoor Sports Centre
Umpires: Marc Henning
Michelle Phippard
Reserve umpire: Joshua Bowring
Folau 34/44 (77%)
Mes 12/20 (60%)
Ekenasio 9/13 (69%)

Aiken 24/31 (77%)
Fowler-Reid 21/22 (95%)
Beckford 15/18 (83%)

== Rugby sevens ==
The New Zealand men's side qualified due to their 2016–17 World Rugby Sevens Series ranking, while the New Zealand women's side qualified due to their 2016–17 World Rugby Women's Sevens Series ranking. Both the men's and women's teams were announced on 21 March 2018.

=== Men's tournament ===
Team

- Kurt Baker
- Dylan Collier
- Scott Curry
- Sam Dickson
- Trael Joass
- Vilimoni Koroi
- Andrew Knewstubb
- Tim Mikkelson
- Sione Molia
- Etene Nanai-Seturo
- Akuila Rokolisoa
- Regan Ware

Travelling reserve: Teddy Stanaway

Pool B

Pos	Team	Pld	W	D	L	PF	PA	PD	Pts	Qualification
1	New Zealand	3	3	0	0	127	14	+113	9	Semi-finals
2	Kenya	3	2	0	1	80	50	+30	7	Classification semi-finals
3	Canada	3	1	0	2	64	59	+5	5	
4	Zambia	3	0	0	3	0	148	−148	3	

Source: GC2018
Rules for classification: 1) Points; 2) Head-to-head result; 3) Point difference; 4) Points scored.

14 April 2018
10:37

New Zealand	54–0	Zambia
Try: Koroi 1' c Nanai-Seturo 4' c Molia 7' m Mikkelson 8' c Rokolisoa 8' c Baker 10' c Knewstubb 11' c Ware 14' c Con: Baker (2/3) 1', 8'; Koroi (1/1) 4'; Rokolisoa (2/2) 9', 10'; Knewstubb (2/2) 11', 14'	(Gold Coast 2018)

Robina Stadium, Gold Coast
Referee: Damon Murphy (Australia)

14 April 2018
14:17

New Zealand	40–7	Kenya
Try: Nanai-Seturo (2) 1' m, 6' c Molia 3' c Ware 8' c Curry 9' c Knewstubb 11' c Con: Koroi (2/3) 3', 6'; Baker (1/1) 8'; Knewstubb (2/2) 10', 11'	(Gold Coast 2018)	Try: Oliech 12' c Con: Oliech (1/1) 13'

Robina Stadium, Gold Coast
Referee: Sam Grove-White (Scotland)

14 April 2018
20:49

New Zealand	33–7	Canada
Try: Curry 1' m Ware (2) 3' c, 8' c Koroi 5' c Baker 11' c Con: Knewstubb (3/4) 3', 5', 8'; Baker (1/1) 11'	(Gold Coast 2018)	Try: Cejvanovic 13' c Con: Hirayama (1/1) 14'; Cards: Jones (yellow card) 2' to 5'

Robina Stadium, Gold Coast
Referee: Craig Evans (Wales)

Semifinal

15 April 2018
11:43

England	12–17	New Zealand
	(Gold Coast 2018)

Robina Stadium, Gold Coast
Referee: Rasta Rasivhenge (South Africa)

Gold medal match

15 April 2018
15:01

New Zealand	14–0	Fiji
	(Gold Coast 2018)

Robina Stadium, Gold Coast
Referee: Damon Murphy (Australia)

=== Women's tournament ===
Team

- Shakira Baker
- Michaela Blyde
- Kelly Brazier
- Gayle Broughton
- Theresa Fitzpatrick
- Sarah Goss
- Tyla Nathan-Wong
- Alena Saili
- Stacey Waaka
- Niall Williams
- Tenika Willison
- Portia Woodman

Travelling reserve: Risi Pouri-Lane

Pool A

Pos	Team	Pld	W	D	L	PF	PA	PD	Pts	Qualification
1	New Zealand	3	3	0	0	110	7	+103	9	Semi-finals
2	Canada	3	2	0	1	60	36	+24	7	Semi-finals
3	Kenya	3	1	0	2	31	79	−48	5	Classification semi-finals
4	South Africa	3	0	0	3	10	89	−79	3	Classification semi-finals

Source: GC2018
Rules for classification: 1) Points; 2) Head-to-head result; 3) Point difference; 4) Points scored.

13 April 2018
16:53

New Zealand	45–0	Kenya
Try: Woodman (3) 1' m, 8' c, 9' c Brazier 2' c Broughton 7' c Williams (2) 11' c, 14' m Con: Nathan-Wong (5/6) 3', 7', 8', 9', 11'; Willison (0/1)	(Gold Coast 2018)

Robina Stadium, Gold Coast
Referee: Rose LaBreche (Canada)

13 April 2018
19:33

New Zealand	41–0	South Africa
Try: Goss 1' c Woodman (2) 1' m, 8' c Blyde 6' m Broughton 7' m Williams 9' c Brazier 12' m Con: Nathan-Wong (3/6) 1', 8', 9'; Willison (0/1)	(Gold Coast 2018)

Robina Stadium, Gold Coast
Referee: Sara Cox (England)

14 April 2018
12:49

New Zealand	24–7	Canada
Try: Woodman 2' m Blyde (2) 9' m, 12' c Waaka 14' c Con: Nathan-Wong (2/4) 12', 14'; Cards: Goss (yellow card) 6' to 8'; Blyde (yellow card) 7' to 9'	(Gold Coast 2018)	Try: Greenshields 7' c Con: Landry (1/1) 7'

Robina Stadium, Gold Coast
Referee: Alhambra Nievas (Spain)

Semifinal

15 April 2018
11:21

New Zealand	26–5	England
	(Gold Coast 2018)

Robina Stadium, Gold Coast
Referee: Alhambra Nievas (Spain)

Gold medal match

15 April 2018
14:39

Australia	12–17	New Zealand
	(Gold Coast 2018)

Robina Stadium, Gold Coast
Referee: Sara Cox (England)

== Shooting ==
The NZOC announced eleven shooters to compete at the Games on 17 January 2018.

Nomination criteria:

Men

Athlete	Event	Qualification		Final	
Athlete	Event	Points	Rank	Points	Rank
Myles Browne-Cole	Trap	109	19	did not advance	
Owen Robinson	Trap	115	12	did not advance	
Ryan Taylor	50 m rifle prone	619.4	2 Q	184.1	5
Scott Wilson	Double trap	127	11	did not advance	
Ricky Zhao	50 m pistol	511 -3x	14	did not advance	

Women

Athlete	Event	Qualification		Final	
Athlete	Event	Points	Rank	Points	Rank
Janet Hunt	50 m rifle prone	—N/a		608.2	10
Sally Johnston	50 m rifle prone	—N/a		607.8	11
Natalie Rooney	Trap	66 +7	7	did not advance	
Chloe Tipple	Skeet	68	7	did not advance	

Open
Queen's Prize (full bore)

Athlete	Event	Day 1	Day 2	Day 3	Total	
Athlete	Event	Points	Points	Points	Points	Rank
Brian Carter	Individual	105 - 14v	148 - 19v	145 - 9v	398 - 42v	15
John Snowden	Individual	105 - 14v	147 - 11v	148 - 10v	400 - 35v	8
Brian Carter; John Snowden	Pairs	296- 34v	285- 16v	—N/a	581- 50v	5

== Squash ==
The seven-member squash team was announced on 7 February 2018.

Individual

Athlete	Event	Round of 64	Round of 32	Round of 16	Quarterfinals	Semifinals	Final / BM	
Athlete	Event	Opposition Score	Opposition Score	Opposition Score	Opposition Score	Opposition Score	Opposition Score	Rank
Paul Coll	Men's singles	Bye	Ndhlovu (ZAM); W 3 – 1	Yuen (MAS); W 3 – 0	Selby (ENG); W 3 – 1	Makin (WAL); W 3 – 2	Willstrop (ENG); L 0 – 3	2nd place, silver medalist(s)
Campbell Grayson	Men's singles	Khalil (GUY); W 3 – 0	Moran (SCO); W 3 – 0	Willstrop (ENG); L 1 – 3	did not advance			
Evan Williams	Men's singles	Kelly (CAY); W 3 – 0	Adnan (MAS); L 1 – 3	did not advance				
Joelle King	Women's singles	Bye	Saffery (WAL); W 3 – 0	Subramaniam (MAS); W 3 – 1	Chinappa (IND); W 3 – 0	David (MAS); W 3 - 1	Perry (ENG); W 3 - 2	1st place, gold medalist(s)
Amanda Landers-Murphy	Women's singles	Bye	Methsarani (SRI); W 3 – 0	Massaro (ENG); L 0 – 3	did not advance			

Doubles

Athlete	Event	Group stage			Round of 16	Quarterfinals	Semifinals	Final / BM	
Athlete	Event	Opposition Score	Opposition Score	Rank	Opposition Score	Opposition Score	Opposition Score	Opposition Score	Rank
Paul Coll; Campbell Grayson	Men's doubles	Doyle & Snagg (SVG); W 2 – 0	Hindle & Zammit-Lewis (MLT); W 2 – 0	1 Q	Aslam & Zaman (PAK); W 2 – 0	Alexander & Palmer (AUS); L 1 – 2	did not advance		
Lance Beddoes; Evan Williams	Men's doubles	Adnan & Yuen (MAS); L 0 – 2	Bailey & Wilson (SVG); W 2 – 0	2 Q	Selby & Waller (ENG); L 0 – 2	did not advance			
Joelle King; Amanda Landers-Murphy	Women's doubles	Arnold & Subramaniam (MAS); L 0 – 2	Cardwell & Nunn (AUS); W 2 – 0	2 Q	—N/a	Duncalf & Waters (ENG); W 2 – 0	Grinham & Urquhart (AUS); W 2 – 0	Chinappa & Pallikal Karthik (IND); W 2 – 0	1st place, gold medalist(s)
Paul Coll; Joelle King	Mixed doubles	Vai & Suari (PNG); W 2 – 0	Hindle & Kellas (MLT); W 2 – 0	1 Q	Best & Simpson (BAR); W 2 – 0	Chinappa & Pal Sandhu (IND); W 2 – 0	Pallikal Karthik & Ghosal (IND); L 1 – 2	Waters & Selby (ENG); W 2 – 0	3rd place, bronze medalist(s)
Zac Millar; Amanda Landers-Murphy	Mixed doubles	Duncalf & Waller (ENG); L 1 – 2	Sultana & Zammit-Lewis (MLT); W 2 – 0	2 Q	Chinappa & Pal Sandhu (IND); L 1 – 2	did not advance			

== Swimming ==
The New Zealand swimming selections were announced on 22 December 2017, with Lewis Clareburt added to the squad on 15 February 2018.

Men

Athlete	Event	Heat		Semifinal		Final	
Athlete	Event	Result	Rank	Result	Rank	Result	Rank
Chris Arbuthnott	100 m freestyle S9	58.78	5 Q	—N/a		58.65	5
Chris Arbuthnott	100 m backstroke S9	1:08.72	7 Q	—N/a		1:07.85	7
Bradlee Ashby	200 m backstroke	2:02.32	14	did not advance			
Bradlee Ashby	200 m butterfly	2:00.30	11	—N/a		did not advance	
Bradlee Ashby	200 m individual medley	2:00.57	5 Q	—N/a		1:59.59	5
Bradlee Ashby	400 m individual medley	4:18.83	5 Q	—N/a		4:18.61	5
Lewis Clareburt	200 m backstroke	2:01.54	10	did not advance			
Lewis Clareburt	200 m butterfly	1:58.32	6 Q	—N/a		1:58.51	7
Lewis Clareburt	200 m individual medley	2:01.33	8 Q	—N/a		2:01.13	7
Lewis Clareburt	400 m individual medley	4:19.16	6 Q	—N/a		4:14.42	3rd place, bronze medalist(s)
Celyn Edwards	100 m breaststroke SB8	1:25.06	5 Q	—N/a		1:25.63	6
Celyn Edwards	200 m individual medley SM8	2:40.28	4 Q	—N/a		2:35.07	4
Daniel Hunter	50 m freestyle	22.32	8 Q	22.34	9	did not advance	
Daniel Hunter	100 m freestyle	49.65	=10 Q	49.11	8 Q	49.30	8
Daniel Hunter	50 m butterfly	24.01	5 Q	23.93	5 Q	23.87	5
Corey Main	100 m backstroke	54.99	4 Q	55.02	7 Q	54.88	7
Corey Main	200 m backstroke	2:01.73	11	did not advance			
Sam Perry	50 m freestyle	22.93	16 Q	23.13	16	did not advance	
Sam Perry	100 m freestyle	49.90	16 Q	49.83	14	did not advance	
Sam Perry	50 m butterfly	24.23	7 Q	23.99	6 Q	23.96	6
Jesse Reynolds	100 m freestyle S9	1:00.06	6 Q	—N/a		1:00.03	6
Jesse Reynolds	100 m backstroke S9	1:06.46	4 Q	—N/a		1:05.50	4
Jesse Reynolds	100 m breaststroke SB8	1:21.82	4 Q	—N/a		1:21.65	4
Matthew Stanley	100 m freestyle	49.79	14 Q	49.61	11	did not advance	
Matthew Stanley	200 m freestyle	1:48.75	12	—N/a		did not advance	
Daniel Hunter; Sam Perry; Corey Main; Matthew Stanley	4 × 100 m freestyle relay	3:17.96	3 Q	—N/a		3:16.60	4

Women

Athlete	Event	Heat		Semifinal		Final	
Athlete	Event	Result	Rank	Result	Rank	Result	Rank
Carina Doyle	100 m freestyle	56.27	13 Q	56.18	12	did not advance	
Carina Doyle	200 m freestyle	2:00.01	10	—N/a		did not advance	
Carina Doyle	400 m freestyle	4:13.33	8 Q	—N/a		4:15.89	8
Helena Gasson	50 m butterfly	27.10	=9 Q	27.19	11	did not advance	
Helena Gasson	100 m butterfly	1:00.00	14 Q	59.70	12	did not advance	
Helena Gasson	200 m butterfly	2:13.25	13	did not advance			
Bobbi Gichard	50 m backstroke	28.81	10 Q	28.56	=10	did not advance	
Bobbi Gichard	100 m backstroke	1:01.33	9 Q	1:01.75	12	did not advance	
Bobbi Gichard	200 m backstroke	2:17.88	13	—N/a		did not advance	
Georgia Marris	100 m freestyle	56.98	15 Q	56.48	15	did not advance	
Georgia Marris	100 m butterfly	1:00.43	15 Q	1:00.58	16	did not advance	
Tupou Neiufi	100 m backstroke S9	1:18.08	6 Q	—N/a		1:17.10	6
Sophie Pascoe	100 m breaststroke SB9	1:17.92	1 Q	—N/a		1:18.09	1st place, gold medalist(s)
Sophie Pascoe	200 m individual medley SM10	2:27.26	1 Q	—N/a		2.27.72	1st place, gold medalist(s)
Bronagh Ryan	50 m breaststroke	32.18	15 Q	32.70	16	did not advance	
Bronagh Ryan	100 m breaststroke	1:10.78	17	did not advance			
Laticia-Leigh Transom	50 m freestyle	25.96	10 Q	25.95	12	did not advance	
Laticia-Leigh Transom	100 m freestyle	56.32	14 Q	56.26	13	did not advance	
Carina Doyle; Helena Gasson; Georgia Marris; Laticia-Leigh Transom	4 × 100 m freestyle relay	—N/a				3:43.77	4
Helena Gasson; Bobbi Gichard; Bronagh Ryan; Laticia-Leigh Transom	4 × 100 m medley relay	—N/a				4:07.47	6

== Triathlon ==
The NZOC announced five triathletes to compete at the games on 9 November 2017. Tony Dodds was added on 14 February 2018.

Individual

Athlete	Event	Swim (750 m)	Transition 1	Bike (20 km)	Transition 2	Run (5 km)	Total	Rank
Tony Dodds	Men's	8:57	0:35	28:04	0:25	17:28	55:29	16
Tayler Reid	Men's	8:49	0:33	27:45	0:24	16:17	53:48	11
Ryan Sissons	Men's	9:01	0:36	27:57	0:25	14:50	52:49	5
Andrea Hewitt	Women's	9:59	0:37	31:16	0:29	18:27	1:00:48	13
Rebecca Spence	Women's	9:46	0:38	30:13	0:28	18:07	59:12	10
Nicole van der Kaay	Women's	9:46	0:34	30:15	0:27	17:29	58:31	7

Mixed relay

Athletes	Event	Total Times per Athlete (Swim 250 m, Bike 7 km, Run 1.5 km)	Total Group Time	Rank
Nicole van der Kaay; Ryan Sissons; Andrea Hewitt; Tayler Reid	Mixed relay	20:14; 18:53; 21:11; 19:10	1:19:28	3rd place, bronze medalist(s)

== Weightlifting ==
The NZOC announced twelve weightlifters to compete at the Games on 24 November 2017.

Nomination criteria:

Men

Athlete	Event	Snatch	Clean & Jerk	Total	Rank
Ianne Guiñares	–62 kg	116	145	261	7
Vester Villalon	–69 kg	118	–	–	DNF
Cameron McTaggart	–77 kg	130	160	290	7
Richie Patterson	–85 kg	–	—N/a		DNF
Stanislav Chalaev	–105 kg	148	–	–	DNF
David Liti	+105 kg	174	229	403 GR	1st place, gold medalist(s)

Women

Athlete	Event	Snatch	Clean & Jerk	Total	Rank
Phillipa Patterson	–53 kg	76	95	171	6
Alethea Boon	–58 kg	81	100	181	5
Andrea Hams	–69 kg	95	109	204	6
Bailey Rogers	–75 kg	88	116	204	4
Tracey Lambrechs	–90 kg	93	120	213	5
Laurel Hubbard	+90 kg	120	–	–	DNF

== Wrestling ==
The seven-member wrestling team was announced on 21 February 2018.

Repechage format

Athlete	Event	Round of 16	Quarterfinal	Semifinal	Repechage	Final / BM	
Athlete	Event	Opposition Result	Opposition Result	Opposition Result	Opposition Result	Opposition Result	Rank
Brahm Richards	Men's freestyle -65 kg	Bajrang (IND); L 0 – 4	—N/a		Daniel (NGR); L 0 – 4	did not advance	
Akash Khullar	Men's freestyle -74 kg	Marianne (MRI); W 4 – 0	Evans (AUS); L 0 – 5	did not advance			
Toby Fitzpatrick	Men's freestyle -86 kg	Bye	Eslami (ENG); L 1 – 3	did not advance			
Sam Belkin	Men's freestyle -97 kg	Erasmus (RSA); L 0 – 4	—N/a		Verreynne (AUS); W 3 – 1	Steen (CAN); L 0 – 4	4

Group stage format

Athlete	Event	Group Stage			Semifinal	Final / BM	
Athlete	Event	Opposition Result	Opposition Result	Rank	Opposition Result	Opposition Result	Rank
Ana Moceyawa	Women's freestyle -57 kg	Schaefer (CAN); L 0 – 5	Dhanda (IND); L 0 – 5	3	did not advance		

Nordic format

Athlete	Event	Nordic Round Robin				Rank
Athlete	Event	Opposition Result	Opposition Result	Opposition Result	Opposition Result	Rank
Tayla Ford	Women's freestyle -62 kg	Fazzari (CAN); L 1 – 4	Etane Ngolle (CMR); W 5 – 0	Adeniyi (NGR); L 0 – 4	Malik (IND); L 1 – 3	4
