= Cycling at the 2018 Commonwealth Games – Women's keirin =

Cycling Track – Women's keirin at the 2018 Commonwealth Games
- Venue: Anna Meares Velodrome
- Dates: 8 April
- Competitors: 15 from 8 nations

Medalists
| gold medal | Stephanie Morton | Australia |
| silver medal | Kaarle McCulloch | Australia |
| bronze medal | Natasha Hansen | New Zealand |

The women's keirin at the 2018 Commonwealth Games was part of the cycling programme, which took place on 8 April 2018.

== Results ==
=== First round ===
The first two riders in each heat qualified to the second round, all other riders advanced to the first round repechages.

==== Heat 1 ====
| Rank | Name | Gap | Notes |
|---|---|---|---|
| 1 | Natasha Hansen (NZL) | – | Q |
| 2 | Robyn Stewart (NIR) | +0.447 | Q |
| 3 | Lauren Bate (ENG) | +0.524 | |
| 4 | Farina Shawati Mohd Adnan (MAS) | +0.544 | |
| 5 | Aleena Reji (IND) | +5.733 | |

==== Heat 2 ====
| Rank | Name | Gap | Notes |
|---|---|---|---|
| 1 | Stephanie Morton (AUS) | – | Q |
| 2 | Lauriane Genest (CAN) | +0.107 | Q |
| 3 | Eleanor Coster (WAL) | +0.241 | |
| 4 | Deborah Deborah (IND) | +0.451 | |
| 5 | Olivia Podmore (NZL) | +0.783 | |

==== Heat 3 ====
| Rank | Name | Gap | Notes |
|---|---|---|---|
| 1 | Fatehah Mustapa (MAS) | – | Q |
| 2 | Kaarle McCulloch (AUS) | +0.000 | Q |
| 3 | Emma Cumming (NZL) | +0.161 | |
| 4 | Rachel James (WAL) | +0.220 | |
| 5 | Amelia Walsh (CAN) | +0.488 | |
| | Katy Marchant (ENG) | DNS | |

=== First round repechages ===
The first three from each heat qualified to the second round.

==== Heat 1 ====
| Rank | Name | Gap | Notes |
|---|---|---|---|
| 1 | Lauren Bate (ENG) | – | Q |
| 2 | Rachel James (WAL) | +0.472 | Q |
| 3 | Emma Cumming (NZL) | +0.585 | Q |
| 4 | Aleena Reji (IND) | +0.732 | |

==== Heat 2 ====
| Rank | Name | Gap | Notes |
|---|---|---|---|
| 1 | Olivia Podmore (NZL) | – | Q |
| 2 | Farina Shawati Mohd Adnan (MAS) | +0.123 | Q |
| 3 | Amelia Walsh (CAN) | +0.208 | Q |
| 4 | Deborah Deborah (IND) | +0.221 | |
| 5 | Eleanor Coster (WAL) | +0.705 | |

=== Second round ===
The first three from each heat qualified for the Gold Medal Final, all the others qualified for the 7-12th place final.

==== Heat 1 ====
| Rank | Name | Gap | Notes |
|---|---|---|---|
| 1 | Kaarle McCulloch (AUS) | – | Q |
| 2 | Natasha Hansen (NZL) | +0.019 | Q |
| 3 | Farina Shawati Mohd Asnan (MAS) | +0.066 | Q |
| 4 | Emma Cumming (NZL) | +0.097 | |
| 5 | Lauriane Genest (CAN) | +0.257 | |
| 6 | Lauren Bate (ENG) | +2.144 | |

==== Heat 2 ====
| Rank | Name | Gap | Notes |
|---|---|---|---|
| 1 | Stephanie Morton (AUS) | – | Q |
| 2 | Olivia Podmore (NZL) | +0.216 | Q |
| 3 | Amelia Walsh (CAN) | +0.288 | Q |
| 4 | Robyn Stewart (NIR) | +0.600 | |
| 5 | Rachel James (WAL) | +1.826 | |
| 6 | Fatehah Mustapa (MAS) | REL | |

=== Finals ===
The finals were started at 20:39.

==== Small final ====
| Rank | Name | Gap | Notes |
|---|---|---|---|
| 7 | Lauriane Genest (CAN) | – | |
| 8 | Fatehah Mustapa (MAS) | +0.113 | |
| 9 | Rachel James (WAL) | +0.141 | |
| 10 | Lauren Bate (ENG) | +0.161 | |
| 11 | Emma Cumming (NZL) | +0.467 | |
| 12 | Robyn Stewart (NIR) | +0.564 | |

==== Final ====
| Rank | Name | Gap | Notes |
|---|---|---|---|
| 1st place, gold medalist(s) | Stephanie Morton (AUS) | – | |
| 2nd place, silver medalist(s) | Kaarle McCulloch (AUS) | +0.079 | |
| 3rd place, bronze medalist(s) | Natasha Hansen (NZL) | +0.133 | |
| 4 | Farina Shawati Mohd Adnan (MAS) | +0.467 | |
| 5 | Amelia Walsh (CAN) | +0.571 | |
| 6 | Olivia Podmore (NZL) | +1.014 | |
