= Swimming at the 2018 Commonwealth Games – Men's 100 metre backstroke S9 =

Men's 100 metre backstroke S9 at the 2018 Commonwealth Games
- Venue: Gold Coast Aquatic Centre
- Dates: 10 April 2018
- Competitors: 8 from 4 nations
- Winning time: 1:04.73

Medalists
gold medal	Brenden Hall	Australia
silver medal	Timothy Hodge	Australia
bronze medal	Logan Powell	Australia

The Men's 100 metre backstroke S9 event at the 2018 Commonwealth Games was held on 10 April at the Gold Coast Aquatic Centre.

== Schedule ==
The schedule is as follows:

All times are Australian Eastern Standard Time (UTC+10)

Date	Time	Round
Tuesday 10 April 2018	6:25	Qualifying
Tuesday 10 April 2018	16:17	Final

== Results ==
=== Heats ===
Rank	Lane	Name	Nationality	Time	Notes
1	4	Timothy Hodge	Australia	1:05.03	Q
2	5	Logan Powell	Australia	1:05.28	Q
3	6	Brenden Hall	Australia	1:06.10	Q
4	3	Jesse Reynolds	New Zealand	1:06.46	Q
5	2	Lewis White	England	1:07.38	Q
6	7	Jacob Leach	England	1:07.81	Q
7	8	Chris Arbuthnott	New Zealand	1:08.72	Q
8	1	Barry McClements	Northern Ireland	1:08.81	Q

=== Final ===
Rank	Lane	Name	Nationality	Time	Notes
1st place, gold medalist(s)	3	Brenden Hall	Australia	1:04.73	
2nd place, silver medalist(s)	4	Timothy Hodge	Australia	1:04.99	
3rd place, bronze medalist(s)	5	Logan Powell	Australia	1:05.29	
4	6	Jesse Reynolds	New Zealand	1:05.50	
5	7	Jacob Leach	England	1:06.59	
6	2	Lewis White	England	1:07.25	
7	1	Chris Arbuthnott	New Zealand	1:07.85	
8	8	Barry McClements	Northern Ireland	1:09.08	
