= Swimming at the 2018 Commonwealth Games – Women's 100 metre butterfly =

Women's 100 metre butterfly at the 2018 Commonwealth Games
- Venue: Gold Coast Aquatic Centre
- Dates: 5 April (heats and semifinals); 6 April (final)
- Competitors: 21 from 12 nations
- Winning time: 56.78

Medalists
gold medal	Emma McKeon	Australia
silver medal	Madeline Groves	Australia
bronze medal	Brianna Throssell	Australia

The women's 100 metre butterfly event at the 2018 Commonwealth Games was held on 5 and 6 April at the Gold Coast Aquatic Centre.

== Records ==
Prior to this competition, the existing world, Commonwealth and Games records were as follows:

World record	Sarah Sjöström (SWE)	55.48	Rio de Janeiro, Brazil	7 August 2016
Commonwealth record	Emma McKeon (AUS)	56.18	Budapest, Hungary	24 July 2017
Games record	Katerine Savard (CAN)	57.40	Glasgow, United Kingdom	25 July 2014

The following records were established during the competition:

Date	Event	Name	Nationality	Time	Record
5 April	Semifinal	Madeline Groves	Australia	57.22	GR
6 April	Final	Emma McKeon	Australia	56.78	GR

== Schedule ==
The schedule is as follows:

All times are Australian Eastern Standard Time (UTC+10)

Date	Time	Round
Thursday 5 April 2018	11:58	Qualifying
Thursday 5 April 2018	21:33	Semifinals
Friday 6 April 2018	21:51	Final

== Results ==
=== Heats ===
Rank	Heat	Lane	Name	Nationality	Time	Notes
1	3	3	Madeline Groves	Australia	57.77	Q
2	3	4	Emma McKeon	Australia	58.04	Q
3	3	5	Alys Thomas	Wales	58.48	Q
4	2	4	Penny Oleksiak	Canada	58.50	Q
5	2	5	Rebecca Smith	Canada	58.51	Q
6	1	4	Brianna Throssell	Australia	58.96	Q
7	1	5	Charlotte Atkinson	Isle of Man	58.97	Q
8	2	6	Erin Gallagher	South Africa	59.25	Q
9	3	2	Mabel Zavaros	Canada	59.44	Q
10	1	6	Harriet Jones	Wales	59.56	Q
11	1	2	Keanna MacInnes	Scotland	59.63	Q
12	1	3	Laura Stephens	England	59.68	Q
13	3	6	Harriet West	Wales	59.77	Q
14	2	2	Helena Gasson	New Zealand	1:00.00	Q
15	3	7	Georgia Marris	New Zealand	1:00.43	Q
16	2	3	Emily Large	England	1:00.46	Q
17	2	7	Dune Coetzee	South Africa	1:02.03	
18	1	7	Elodie Poo-cheong	Mauritius	1:04.39	
19	3	1	Matelita Buadromo	Fiji	1:04.43	
20	2	1	Katie Kyle	Saint Lucia	1:05.74	
21	1	1	Aaliyah Palestrini	Seychelles	1:08.64	

=== Semifinals ===
Rank	Heat	Lane	Name	Nationality	Time	Notes
1	2	4	Madeline Groves	Australia	57.22	Q, GR
2	2	2	Rebecca Smith	Canada	57.77	Q
3	1	4	Emma McKeon	Australia	57.94	Q
4	2	6	Charlotte Atkinson	Isle of Man	58.04	Q
5	2	5	Alys Thomas	Wales	58.17	Q
6	1	5	Penny Oleksiak	Canada	58.29	Q
7	1	3	Brianna Throssell	Australia	58.38	Q
8	2	3	Mabel Zavaros	Canada	58.62	Q
9	1	6	Erin Gallagher	South Africa	59.04	
10	1	2	Harriet Jones	Wales	59.49	
11	2	7	Keanna MacInnes	Scotland	59.55	
12	1	1	Helena Gasson	New Zealand	59.70	
13	2	1	Harriet West	Wales	59.93	
14	1	8	Emily Large	England	59.96	
15	1	7	Laura Stephens	England	1:00.18	
16	2	8	Georgia Marris	New Zealand	1:00.58	

=== Final ===
Rank	Lane	Name	Nationality	Time	Notes
1st place, gold medalist(s)	3	Emma McKeon	Australia	56.78	GR
2nd place, silver medalist(s)	4	Madeline Groves	Australia	57.19	
3rd place, bronze medalist(s)	1	Brianna Throssell	Australia	57.30	
4	7	Penny Oleksiak	Canada	57.50	
5	6	Charlotte Atkinson	Isle of Man	57.88	
6	5	Rebecca Smith	Canada	57.91	
7	2	Alys Thomas	Wales	58.06	
8	8	Mabel Zavaros	Canada	58.98	
