= Cycling at the 2018 Commonwealth Games – Women's 500 m time trial =

Cycling Track – Women's 500 m time trial at the 2018 Commonwealth Games
- Venue: Anna Meares Velodrome
- Dates: 7 April
- Competitors: 16 from 7 nations
- Winning time: 33.583

Medalists
gold medal	Kaarle McCulloch	Australia
silver medal	Stephanie Morton	Australia
bronze medal	Emma Cumming	New Zealand

The women's 500 m time trial at the 2018 Commonwealth Games, was part of the cycling programme, which took place on 7 April 2018.

== Records ==
Prior to this competition, the existing world and Games records were as follows:

World record	Jessica Salazar (MEX)	32.268	Aguascalientes, Mexico	7 October 2016
Games record	Anna Meares (AUS)	33.435	Glasgow, United Kingdom	24 July 2014

== Results ==
Rank	Rider	Time	Behind	Notes
1st place, gold medalist(s)	Kaarle McCulloch (AUS)	33.583	–	
2nd place, silver medalist(s)	Stephanie Morton (AUS)	33.619	+0.036	
3rd place, bronze medalist(s)	Emma Cumming (NZL)	34.230	+0.647	
4	Natasha Hansen (NZL)	34.238	+0.655	
5	Lauren Bate (ENG)	34.546	+0.963	
6	Katy Marchant (ENG)	34.583	+1.000	
7	Rachel James (WAL)	34.780	+1.197	
8	Fatehah Mustapa (MAS)	34.894	+1.311	
9	Lauriane Genest (CAN)	35.073	+1.490	
10	Amelia Walsh (CAN)	35.647	+2.064	
11	Eleanor Coster (WAL)	35.700	+2.117	
12	Ellesse Andrews (NZL)	35.850	+2.267	
13	Deborah Herold (IND)	36.176	+2.593	
14	Aleena Reji (IND)	36.308	+2.725	
15	Rebecca Raybould (ENG)	37.210	+3.627	
16	Ciara Horne (WAL)	37.388	+3.805	
