= Swimming at the 2018 Commonwealth Games – Women's 100 metre freestyle =

Women's 100 metre freestyle at the 2018 Commonwealth Games
- Venue: Gold Coast Aquatic Centre
- Dates: 8 April (heats, semifinals); 9 April (final)
- Competitors: 34 from 22 nations
- Winning time: 52.27

Medalists
gold medal	Bronte Campbell	Australia
silver medal	Cate Campbell	Australia
bronze medal	Taylor Ruck	Canada

The women's 100 metre freestyle event at the 2018 Commonwealth Games was held on 8 and 9 April at the Gold Coast Aquatic Centre.

== Records ==
Prior to this competition, the existing world, Commonwealth and Games records were as follows:

World record	Sarah Sjöström (SWE)	51.71	Budapest, Hungary	23 July 2017
Commonwealth record	Cate Campbell (AUS)	52.06	Brisbane, Australia	2 July 2016
Games record	Cate Campbell (AUS)	52.68	Glasgow, United Kingdom	28 July 2014

The following records were established during the competition:

Date	Event	Name	Nationality	Time	Record
8 April	Semifinal	Cate Campbell	Australia	52.64	GR
9 April	Final	Bronte Campbell	Australia	52.27	GR

== Results ==
=== Heats ===
The heats were held on 8 April from 10:58 to 11:08.

Rank	Heat	Lane	Name	Nationality	Time	Notes
1	5	4	Cate Campbell	Australia	54.05	Q
2	5	5	Taylor Ruck	Canada	54.79	Q
3	4	4	Bronte Campbell	Australia	54.81	Q
4	3	4	Penny Oleksiak	Canada	54.88	Q
5	5	3	Kayla Sanchez	Canada	54.97	Q
6	4	5	Shayna Jack	Australia	55.00	Q
7	3	5	Freya Anderson	England	55.12	Q
8	4	3	Anna Hopkin	England	55.21	Q
9	3	3	Erin Gallagher	South Africa	55.36	Q
10	5	6	Lucy Hope	Scotland	55.56	Q
11	4	6	Jessica Jackson	England	55.85	Q
12	5	7	Emma Chelius	South Africa	56.04	Q
13	3	2	Carina Doyle	New Zealand	56.27	Q
14	4	2	Laticia Transom	New Zealand	56.32	Q
15	3	7	Georgia Marris	New Zealand	56.98	Q
16	5	2	Ting Wen Quah	Singapore	57.46	Q
17	4	1	Maria Brunlehner	Kenya	57.75	
18	2	5	Gemma Atherley	Jersey	58.42	
19	4	7	Kalia Antoniou	Cyprus	58.65	
20	4	8	Lauren Hew	Cayman Islands	58.79	
21	3	1	Lushavel Stickland	Samoa	59.01	
22	5	8	Alison Jackson	Cayman Islands	59.54	
23	3	8	Elodie Poo Cheong	Mauritius	59.69	
24	2	5	Cheyenne Rova	Fiji	59.94	
25	2	6	Tatiana Tostevin	Guernsey	1:00.31	
26	1	4	Therese Soukup	Seychelles	1:00.92	
27	1	5	Aaliyah Palestrini	Seychelles	1:01.15	
28	2	7	Christina Linares	Gibraltar	1:01.29	
29	2	2	Makaela Holowchak	Antigua and Barbuda	1:01.61	
30	2	1	Vinoli Kaluarachchi	Sri Lanka	1:02.25	
31	2	3	Bisma Khan	Pakistan	1:02.66	
32	2	8	Jamila Sanmoogan	Guyana	1:03.39	
33	1	6	Maayaa Ayawere	Ghana	1:04.71	
34	1	3	Aliah Maginley	Antigua and Barbuda	1:06.20	
	3	6	Kathryn Greenslade	Wales	DNS	
	5	1	Danielle Hill	Northern Ireland	DNS	

=== Semifinals ===
The semifinals were held on 8 April at 19:59 and 20:03.

==== Semifinal 1 ====
Rank	Lane	Name	Nationality	Time	Notes
1	4	Taylor Ruck	Canada	53.05	Q
2	3	Shayna Jack	Australia	53.58	Q
3	5	Penny Oleksiak	Canada	54.34	Q
4	6	Anna Hopkin	England	55.17	Q
5	2	Lucy Hope	Scotland	55.43	
6	1	Laticia Transom	New Zealand	56.26	
7	7	Emma Chelius	South Africa	56.40	
8	8	Ting Wen Quah	Singapore	57.51	

==== Semifinal 2 ====
Rank	Lane	Name	Nationality	Time	Notes
1	4	Cate Campbell	Australia	52.64	Q, GR
2	5	Bronte Campbell	Australia	53.46	Q
3	3	Kayla Sanchez	Canada	54.18	Q
4	2	Erin Gallagher	South Africa	54.38	Q, AF
5	6	Freya Anderson	England	55.28	
6	7	Jessica Jackson	England	55.84	
7	1	Carina Doyle	New Zealand	56.18	
8	8	Georgia Marris	New Zealand	56.48	

=== Final ===
The final was held on 9 April at 21:44.

Rank	Lane	Name	Nationality	Time	Notes
1st place, gold medalist(s)	3	Bronte Campbell	Australia	52.27	GR
2nd place, silver medalist(s)	4	Cate Campbell	Australia	52.69	
3rd place, bronze medalist(s)	5	Taylor Ruck	Canada	53.08	
4	6	Shayna Jack	Australia	53.83	
5	7	Penny Oleksiak	Canada	53.85	
6	1	Erin Gallagher	South Africa	54.23	AF
7	2	Kayla Sanchez	Canada	54.30	
8	8	Anna Hopkin	England	55.03	
