= Cycling at the 2018 Commonwealth Games – Women's sprint =

Event at the 2018 Commonwealth Games

Cycling Track – Women's sprint at the 2018 Commonwealth Games
- Venue: Anna Meares Velodrome
- Dates: 6 April
- Competitors: 16 from 8 nations

Medalists
gold medal	Stephanie Morton	Australia
silver medal	Natasha Hansen	New Zealand
bronze medal	Kaarle McCulloch	Australia

The women's sprint at the 2018 Commonwealth Games was part of the cycling programme, which took place on 6 April 2018.

== Records ==
Prior to this competition, the existing world and Games records were as follows:

World record	Kristina Vogel (GER)	10.384	Aguascalientes, Mexico	7 December 2013
Games record	Stephanie Morton (AUS)	10.984	Glasgow, Scotland	26 July 2014

== Schedule ==
The schedule is as follows:

All times are Australian Eastern Standard Time (UTC+10)

Date	Time	Round
Friday 6 April 2018	13:02	Qualifying
Friday 6 April 2018	14:32	1/8 Finals
Friday 6 April 2018	15:01	Quarterfinals
Friday 6 April 2018	19:22	Semifinals
Friday 6 April 2018	20:48	Finals

== Results ==
=== Qualifying ===
All 16 riders will be seeded for the 1/8 finals according to their times in qualification.

Rank	Riders	Time	Behind	Average speed (km/h)	Notes
1	Stephanie Morton (AUS)	10.524	—	68.415	GR
2	Lauriane Genest (CAN)	10.757	+0.233	66.933	
3	Natasha Hansen (NZL)	10.760	+0.236	66.914	
4	Kaarle McCulloch (AUS)	10.777	+0.253	66.809	
5	Olivia Podmore (NZL)	10.985	+0.461	65.544	
6	Rachel James (WAL)	11.039	+0.515	65.223	
7	Katy Marchant (ENG)	11.043	+0.519	65.200	
8	Emma Cumming (NZL)	11.079	+0.555	64.988	
9	Robyn Stewart (NIR)	11.082	+0.558	64.970	
10	Lauren Bate (ENG)	11.127	+0.603	64.707	
11	Fatehah Mustapa (MAS)	11.142	+0.618	64.620	
12	Amelia Walsh (CAN)	11.229	+0.705	64.120	
13	Deborah Deborah (IND)	11.484	+0.960	62.696	
14	Eleanor Coster (WAL)	11.533	+1.009	62.430	
15	Farina Shawati Mohd Adnan (MAS)	11.585	+1.061	62.149	
16	Aleena Reji (IND)	12.207	+1.683	58.983	

=== 1/8 Finals ===
Heat winners advance to the quarterfinals.

Heat	Rank	Riders	Time (Gap)	Notes
1	1	Stephanie Morton (AUS)	—	Q
1	2	Aleena Reji (IND)	+0.106	
2	1	Lauriane Genest (CAN)	—	Q
2	2	Farina Shawati Mohd Adnan (MAS)	+0.131	
3	1	Natasha Hansen (NZL)	—	Q
3	2	Eleanor Coster (WAL)	+1.864	
4	1	Kaarle McCulloch (AUS)	—	Q
4	2	Deborah Deborah (IND)	+0.117	
5	1	Olivia Podmore (NZL)	—	Q
5	2	Amelia Walsh (CAN)	+0.179	
6	1	Fatehah Mustapa (MAS)	—	Q
6	2	Rachel James (WAL)	+0.095	
7	1	Lauren Bate (ENG)	—	Q
7	2	Katy Marchant (ENG)	+0.006	
8	1	Emma Cumming (NZL)	—	Q
8	2	Robyn Stewart (NIR)	+0.082	

=== Quarterfinals ===
Matches are extended to a best-of-three format hereon; winners proceed to the semifinals.

Heat	Rank	Riders	Race 1	Race 2	Decider (i.r.)	Notes
1	1	Stephanie Morton (AUS)	X	X		Q
1	2	Emma Cumming (NZL)	+0.810	+0.509		
2	1	Lauriane Genest (CAN)	X	X		Q
2	2	Lauren Bate (ENG)	+0.039	+0.043		
3	1	Natasha Hansen (NZL)	X	X		Q
3	2	Fatehah Mustapa (MAS)	+0.548	+0.014		
4	1	Kaarle McCulloch (AUS)	X	X		Q
4	2	Olivia Podmore (NZL)	+0.070	+0.035		

=== Semifinals ===
Winners proceed to the gold medal final; losers proceed to the bronze medal final.

Heat	Rank	Riders	Race 1	Race 2	Decider (i.r.)	Notes
1	1	Stephanie Morton (AUS)	X	X		QG
1	2	Kaarle McCulloch (AUS)	+0.109	+0.488		QB
2	1	Natasha Hansen (NZL)	X	+0.012	X	QG
2	2	Lauriane Genest (CAN)	+0.052	X	+0.001	QB

=== Finals ===
The final classification is determined in the medal finals.

Rank	Riders	Race 1	Race 2	Decider (i.r.)
Bronze medal final
3rd place, bronze medalist(s)	Kaarle McCulloch (AUS)	X	X	
4	Lauriane Genest (CAN)	+0.071	+1.031	
Gold medal final
1st place, gold medalist(s)	Stephanie Morton (AUS)	X	X	
2nd place, silver medalist(s)	Natasha Hansen (NZL)	+0.089	+1.286	
