= Edgar Stepanyan =

Armenian cyclist

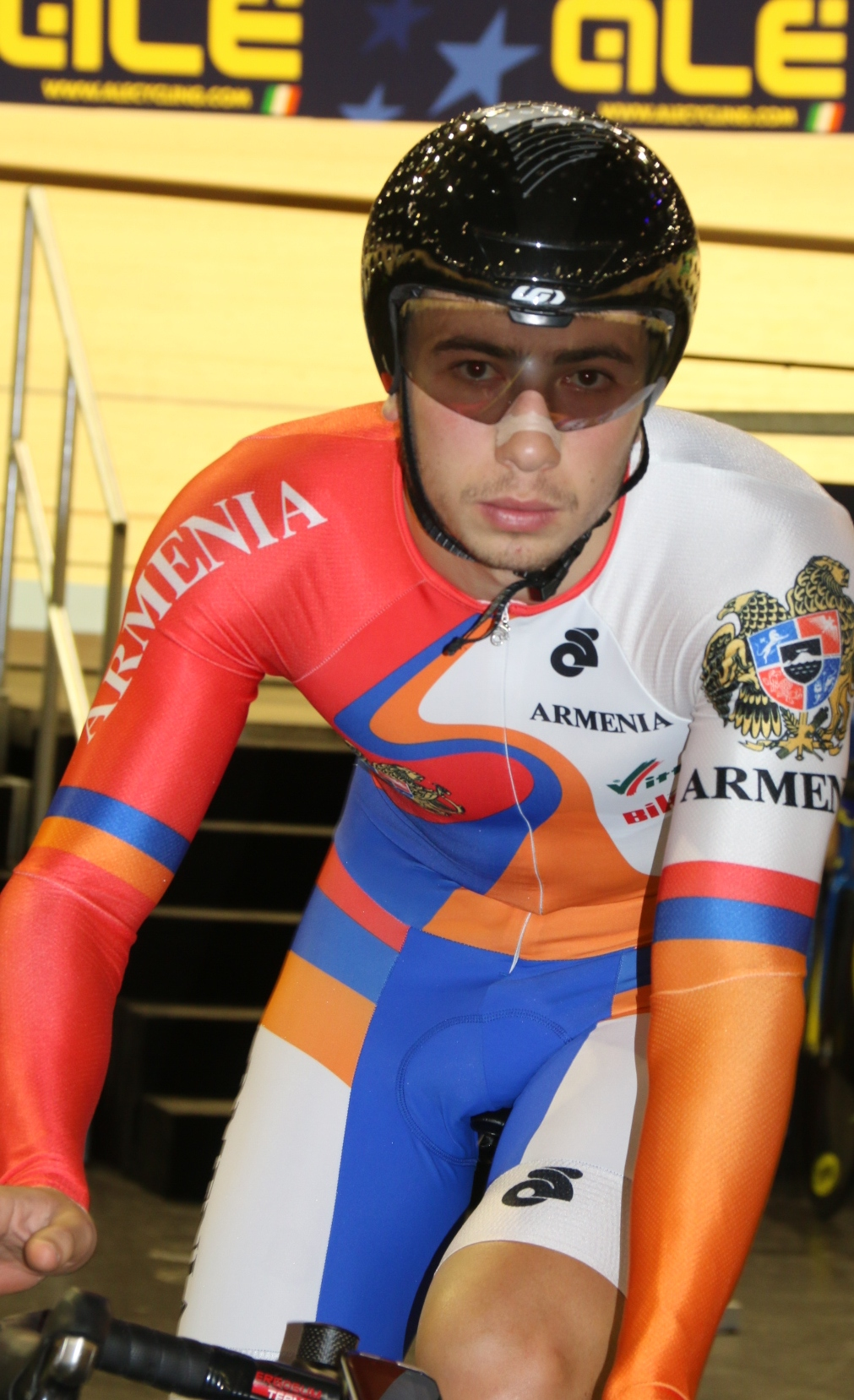
- Stepanyan at the 2017 UEC European Track Championships

Personal information
- Born: 1 January 1997 (age 29) Armenia

Cycling career
- Sport: Cycling
- Disciplines: Track; road
- Role: Rider

Edgar Stepanyan (born 1 January 1997) is an Armenian track cyclist and an International Master of sports.

== Career ==
He became the first Armenian to win a European cycling championship when he won the scratch race at the 2015 UEC European Junior Track Championships. Four days later, he won the silver medal in the points race at the UCI Junior Track World Championships.

== Major results ==
2014
3rd Points race, UCI Junior Track World Championships
2015
1st Scratch, UEC European Junior Track Championships
2nd Points race, UCI Junior Track World Championships
2017
2017–18 UCI World Cup

2nd Scratch – Pruszków

2018
1st Points race, UEC European Under–23 Track Championships

== Awards ==
- Armenian Best Athlete (2018)
- Top 10 Armenian Best Athlete (2017)
- Dana Point Grand prix (pro 1.2.3), Gold (2018) United States CA
- Cbr Dominguez Hills Crit Gold (2018) United States CA
- Trofeu International De Anadia Silver (2017) Portugal Anadia
- Armenian Championships Gold (2014 - 2019)
