= Cycling at the 2018 Commonwealth Games – Women's team sprint =

Cycling Track – Women's team sprint at the 2018 Commonwealth Games
- Venue: Anna Meares Velodrome
- Dates: 5 April
- Competitors: 14 from 7 nations
- Winning time: 32.488 GR

Medalists
gold medal	Kaarle McCulloch; Stephanie Morton	Australia
silver medal	Natasha Hansen; Emma Cumming	New Zealand
bronze medal	Lauren Bate; Katy Marchant	England

The women's team sprint at the 2018 Commonwealth Games was part of the cycling programme, which took place on 5 April 2018.

== Records ==
Prior to this competition, the existing world and Games records were as follows:

World record (Note: The mark of 31.928 set by China (Gong Jinjie, Zhong Tianshi) in the 2016 Olympic Games was not ratified.)	China (Gong Jinjie, Zhong Tianshi)	32.034	Saint-Quentin-en-Yvelines, France	18 February 2015
Games record	Australia (Kaarle McCulloch, Anna Meares)	33.811	Delhi, India	6 October 2010

== Schedule ==
The schedule is as follows:

All times are Australian Eastern Standard Time (UTC+10)

Date	Time	Round
Thursday 5 April 2018	16:24	Qualifying
Thursday 5 April 2018	20:51 / 20:58	Finals

== Results ==
=== Qualifying ===
The two fastest teams advance to the gold medal final. The next two fastest teams advance to the bronze medal final.

Rank	Nation	Time	Behind	Notes
1	Australia; Kaarle McCulloch; Stephanie Morton	32.578	–	QG, GR
2	New Zealand; Emma Cumming; Natasha Hansen	33.321	+0.743	QG
3	England; Lauren Bate; Katy Marchant	33.739	+1.161	QB
4	Wales; Rachel James; Eleanor Coster	34.413	+1.835	QB
5	Malaysia; Farina Shawati Mohd Adnan; Fatehah Mustapa	34.826	+2.248	
6	India; Aleena Reji; Deborah Herold	35.309	+2.731	
	Canada; Amelia Walsh; Lauriane Genest	DSQ		

=== Finals ===
The final classification is determined in the medal finals.

Rank	Nation	Time	Behind	Notes
Bronze medal final
3rd place, bronze medalist(s)	England; Lauren Bate; Katy Marchant	33.893	–	
4	Wales; Rachel James; Eleanor Coster	34.415	+0.522	
Gold medal final
1st place, gold medalist(s)	Australia; Kaarle McCulloch; Stephanie Morton	32.488	–	GR
2nd place, silver medalist(s)	New Zealand; Natasha Hansen; Emma Cumming	33.115	+0.627	
