= Rohan Wight =

Australian cyclist (born 1997)

Rohan "The Weasel" Wight
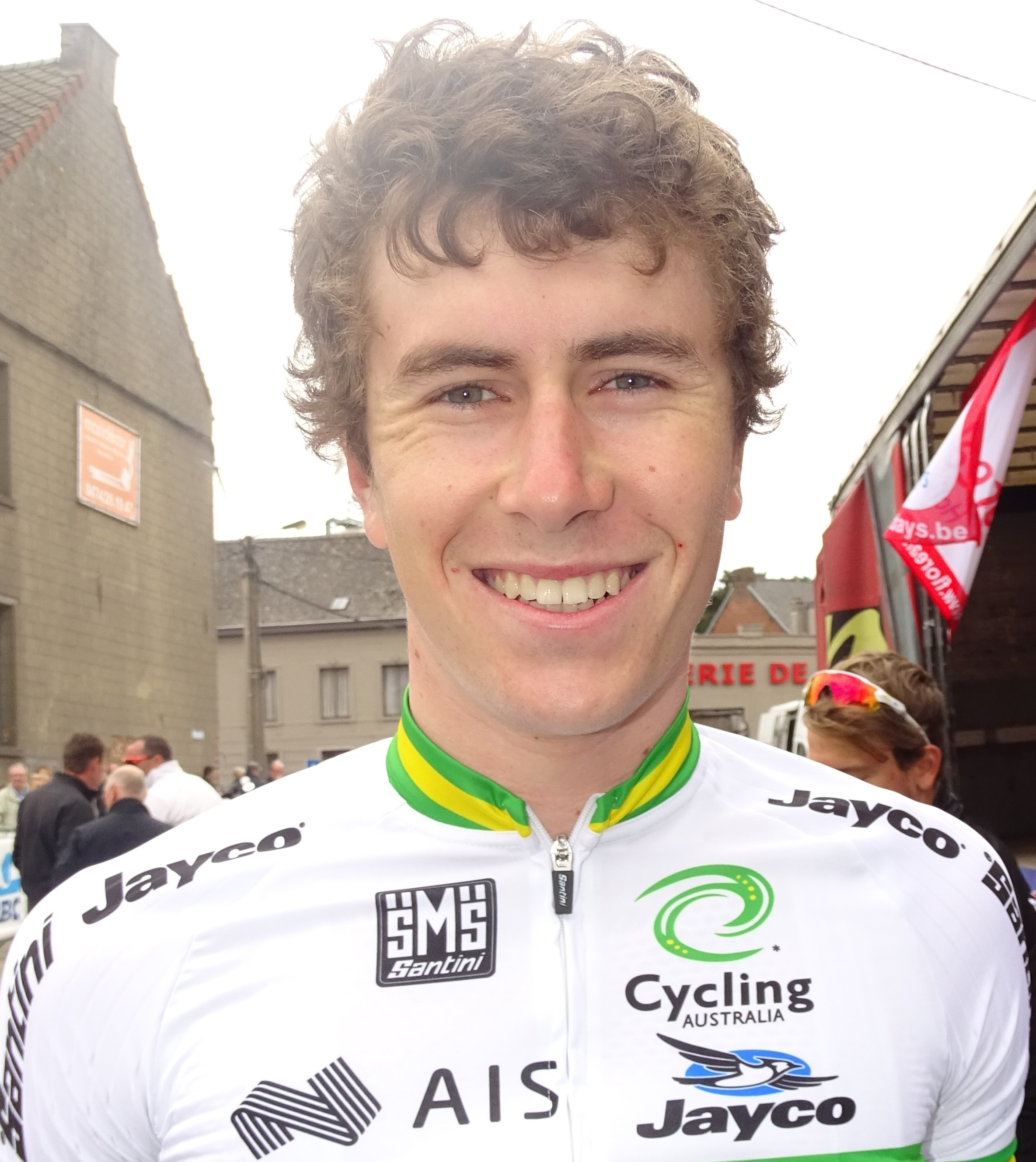
- Wight in 2016

Personal information
- Full name: Rohan Wight
- Nickname: The Weasel
- Born: 30 January 1997 (age 29)

Cycling career
- Sport: Cycling
- Disciplines: Road; Track
- Role: Rider

Professional team
- 2018: Tirol Cycling Team
Medal record
World Championships
Gold medal – first place	2017 Hong Kong	Team pursuit

Rohan "The Weasel" Wight (born 30 January 1997) is an Australian professional racing cyclist. He rode in the men's team pursuit event at the 2017 UCI Track Cycling World Championships.

== Major results ==
2013
3rd Time trial, National Novice Road Championships
2014
1st Team pursuit, Oceania Junior Track Championships
National Junior Track Championships

1st Omnium
1st Team pursuit

3rd Time trial, Oceania Junior Road Championships
2015
UCI Juniors Track World Championships

1st Madison
1st Team pursuit
2nd Omnium

1st Time trial, National Junior Road Championships
1st Team pursuit, National Junior Track Championships
Oceania Track Championships

2nd Individual pursuit
2nd Team pursuit

2016
2nd Madison, National Track Championships
2017
1st Team pursuit, UCI Track Cycling World Championships
2nd Madison, Oceania Track Championships
National Track Championships

2nd Team pursuit
3rd Madison

2018
1st Madison, National Track Championships
