= Cor Tabak =

Dutch weightlifter

Personal information
- Full name: Cornelis Gerardus Tabak
- Born: 2 July 1907 Beverwijk, the Netherlands
- Died: 23 October 2001 (aged 94) Heemskerk, the Netherlands

Sport
- Country: Netherlands
- Sport: Weightlifting
- Weight class: Lightweight
- Updated on 12 December 2016

Cornelis Gerardus "Cor" Tabak (2 July 1907 – 23 October 2001) was a Dutch male weightlifter, who competed in the lightweight category and represented the Netherlands at international competitions. He competed at the 1928 Summer Olympics, finishing in 10th place.

His great-granddaughter was Olivia Podmore.
