= 2015 UCI Juniors Track World Championships =

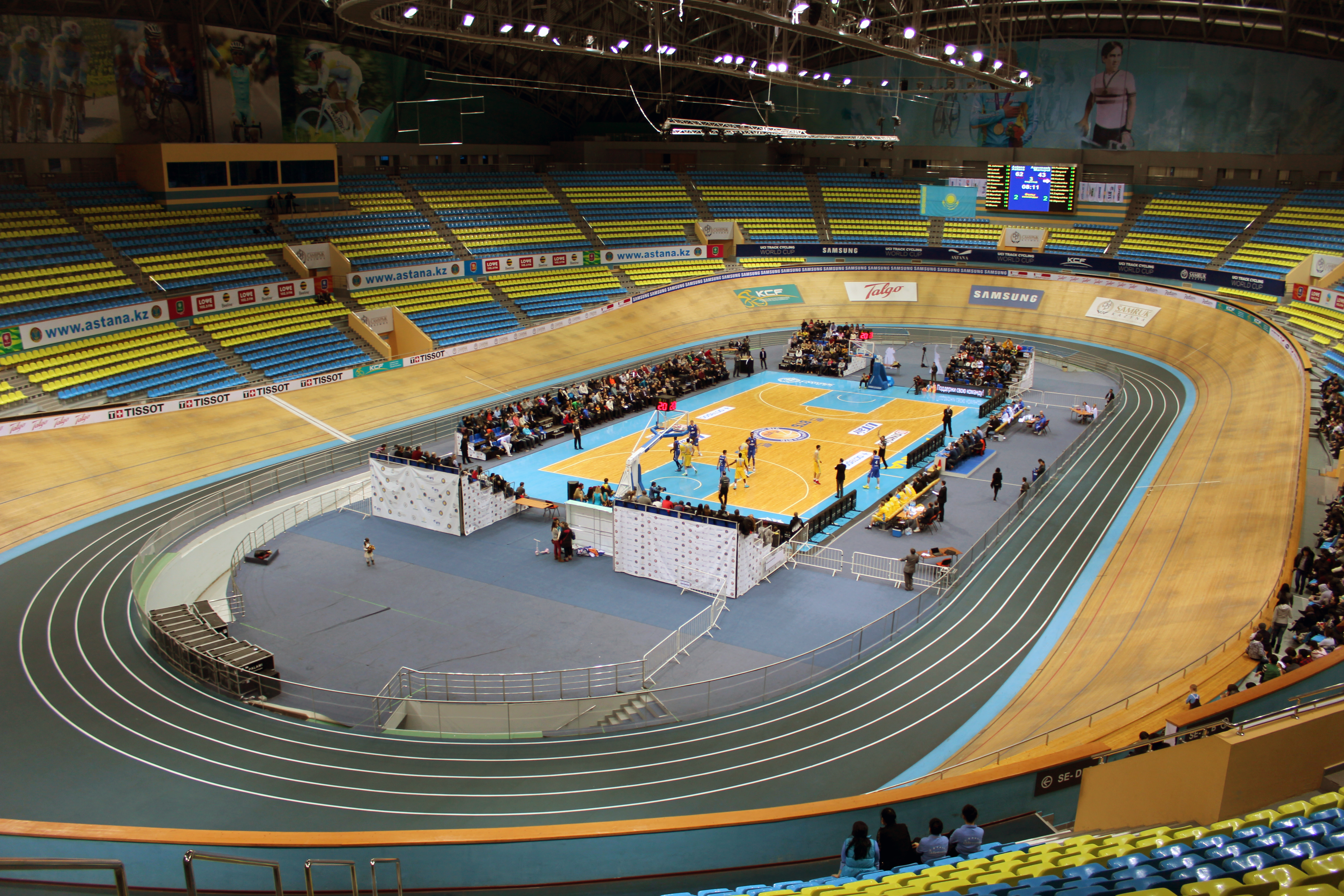
- Saryarka Velodrome
- Venue: Saryarka Velodrome in Astana Kazakhstan
- Date: 19–23 August 2015

The 2015 UCI Juniors Track World Championships were the 41st annual Junior World Championships for track cycling, held at the Saryarka Velodrome in Astana, Kazakhstan from 19 to 23 August.

The Championships had ten events for men (sprint, points race, individual pursuit, team pursuit, 1 kilometre time trial, team sprint, keirin, madison, scratch race, omnium) and nine for women (sprint, individual pursuit, 500 metre time trial, points race, keirin, scratch race, team sprint, team pursuit, omnium).

== Medal summary ==
| Event | Gold | Silver | Bronze |
|---|---|---|---|
Men's Events
| Sprint | Park Je One; South Korea | Jiří Janošek; Czech Republic | Moritz Meissner; Germany |
| Points race | Shunsuke Imamura; Japan | Edgar Stepanyan; Armenia | Gerben Thijssen; Belgium |
| Individual pursuit | Leo Appelt; Germany | Daniel Staniszewski; Poland | Kelland O'Brien; Australia |
| Team pursuit | Rohan Wight; Alex Rendell; Kelland O'Brien; James Robinson; Australia | Reto Muller; Stefan Bissegger; Robin Froidevaux; Gino Mäder; Switzerland | Sergey Rostovtsev; Maxim Piskunov; Dmitrii Markov; Maxim Sukhov; Russia |
| Time trial | Jiří Janošek; Czech Republic | Alexandr Vasyukhno; Russia | Cameron Scott; Australia |
| Team sprint | Sergei Isaev; Alexey Nosov; Alexandr Vasyukhno; Russia | Cameron Scott; Conor Rowley; Derek Radzikiewicz; Australia | Mateusz Milek; Michal Lewandowski; Marcin Czyszczewski; Poland |
| Keirin | Derek Radzikiewicz; Australia | Jiří Janošek; Czech Republic | Moritz Meissner; Germany |
| Madison | Kelland O'Brien; Rohan Wight; Australia | Maxim Piskunov; Dmitrii Markov; Russia | Imerio Cima; Carloalberto Giordani; Italy |
| Scratch race | Campbell Stewart; New Zealand | Yuttana Mano; Thailand | Denis Nekrasov; Russia |
| Omnium | Campbell Stewart; New Zealand | Rohan Wight; Australia | Max Kanter; Germany |

| Event | Gold | Silver | Bronze |
|---|---|---|---|
Men's Events
| Sprint | Emma Hinze; Germany | Courtney Field; Australia | Kseniya Bogoyavlenskaya; Russia |
| Individual pursuit | Justyna Kaczkowska; Poland | Marion Borras; France | Madeleine Park; New Zealand |
| Time trial | Pauline Grabosch; Germany | Emma Hinze; Germany | Olivia Podmore; New Zealand |
| Points race | Daria Pikulik; Poland | Yumi Kajihara; Japan | Kristina Selina; Russia |
| Keirin | Emma Hinze; Germany | Courtney Field; Australia | Sára Kaňkovská; Czech Republic |
| Scratch race | Elisa Balsamo; Italy | Justyna Kaczkowska; Poland | Nicola MacDonald; Australia |
| Team sprint | Pauline Grabosch; Emma Hinze; Germany | Emma Cumming; Olivia Podmore; New Zealand | Miriam Vece; Elena Bissolati; Italy |
| Team pursuit | Bryony Botha; Michaela Drummond; Madeleine Park; Holly White; New Zealand | Danielle McKinnirey; Nicola MacDonald; Chloe Moran; Brooke Tucker; Australia | Yumi Kajihara; Kie Furuyama; Yuya Hashimoto; Nao Suzuki; Japan |
| Omnium | Danielle McKinnirey; Australia | Daria Pikulik; Poland | Martina Alzini; Italy |

== Medal table ==
* Host nation (Kazakhstan)

| Rank | Nation | Gold | Silver | Bronze | Total |
|---|---|---|---|---|---|
| 1 | Germany (GER) | 5 | 1 | 3 | 9 |
| 2 | Australia (AUS) | 4 | 5 | 3 | 12 |
| 3 | New Zealand (NZL) | 3 | 1 | 2 | 6 |
| 4 | Poland (POL) | 2 | 3 | 1 | 6 |
| 5 | Russia (RUS) | 1 | 2 | 4 | 7 |
| 6 | Czech Republic (CZE) | 1 | 2 | 1 | 4 |
| 7 | Japan (JPN) | 1 | 1 | 1 | 3 |
| 8 | Italy (ITA) | 1 | 0 | 3 | 4 |
| 9 | South Korea (KOR) | 1 | 0 | 0 | 1 |
| 10 | Armenia (ARM) | 0 | 1 | 0 | 1 |
| 10 | France (FRA) | 0 | 1 | 0 | 1 |
| 10 | Switzerland (SUI) | 0 | 1 | 0 | 1 |
| 10 | Thailand (THA) | 0 | 1 | 0 | 1 |
| 14 | Belgium (BEL) | 0 | 0 | 1 | 1 |
| Totals (14 entries) | | 19 | 19 | 19 | 57 |
