= Katie Schofield =

New Zealand cyclist

Personal information
- Born: 25 March 1984 (age 42)

Cycling career
- Sport: Cycling
- Role: Rider

Katie Schofield (born 25 March 1984) is a New Zealand professional racing cyclist. She rode the 500 m time trial and team sprint at the 2015 UCI Track Cycling World Championships.

== Major results ==
2014
Oceania Track Championships

1st 500m Time Trial
2nd Team Sprint (with Stephanie McKenzie)

3rd Sprint, BikeNZ Classic
3rd Sprint, BikeNZ Cup
2015
Oceania Track Championships

2nd Team Sprint (with Natasha Hansen)
3rd 500m Time Trial

3rd Scratch Race, Champions of Sprint
