= Stephanie McKenzie =

New Zealand cyclist

Personal information
- Born: 15 February 1993 (age 32)

Team information
- Role: Rider

Stephanie McKenzie (born 15 February 1993) is a New Zealand professional racing cyclist. At age eight Stephanie was diagnosed with Type 1 Diabetes and due to it joined the Novo Nordisk team. Later on, she decided to attend Massey University where she plans on obtaining Bachelor of Sport and Exercise degree and join New Zealand Police. Before being introduced to cycling McKenzie did gymnastics, swimming and competed as a triathlete. She represented New Zealand at the 2010 and 2011 UCI Juniors World Championships as well as during the 2014 Commonwealth Games and the 2015 UCI Track Cycling World Championships.

== Major results ==
2013
2nd Keirin, Invercargill
2014
BikeNZ Classic

1st Keirin
2nd Sprint

Oceania Track Championships

2nd Team Sprint (with Katie Schofield)
2nd 500m Time Trial

2nd Sprint, Festival of Speed
2nd Sprint, BikeNZ Cup
2015
2nd Keirin, Grand Prix of Colorado Springs
