= Logan Powell =

Australian Paralympic swimmer

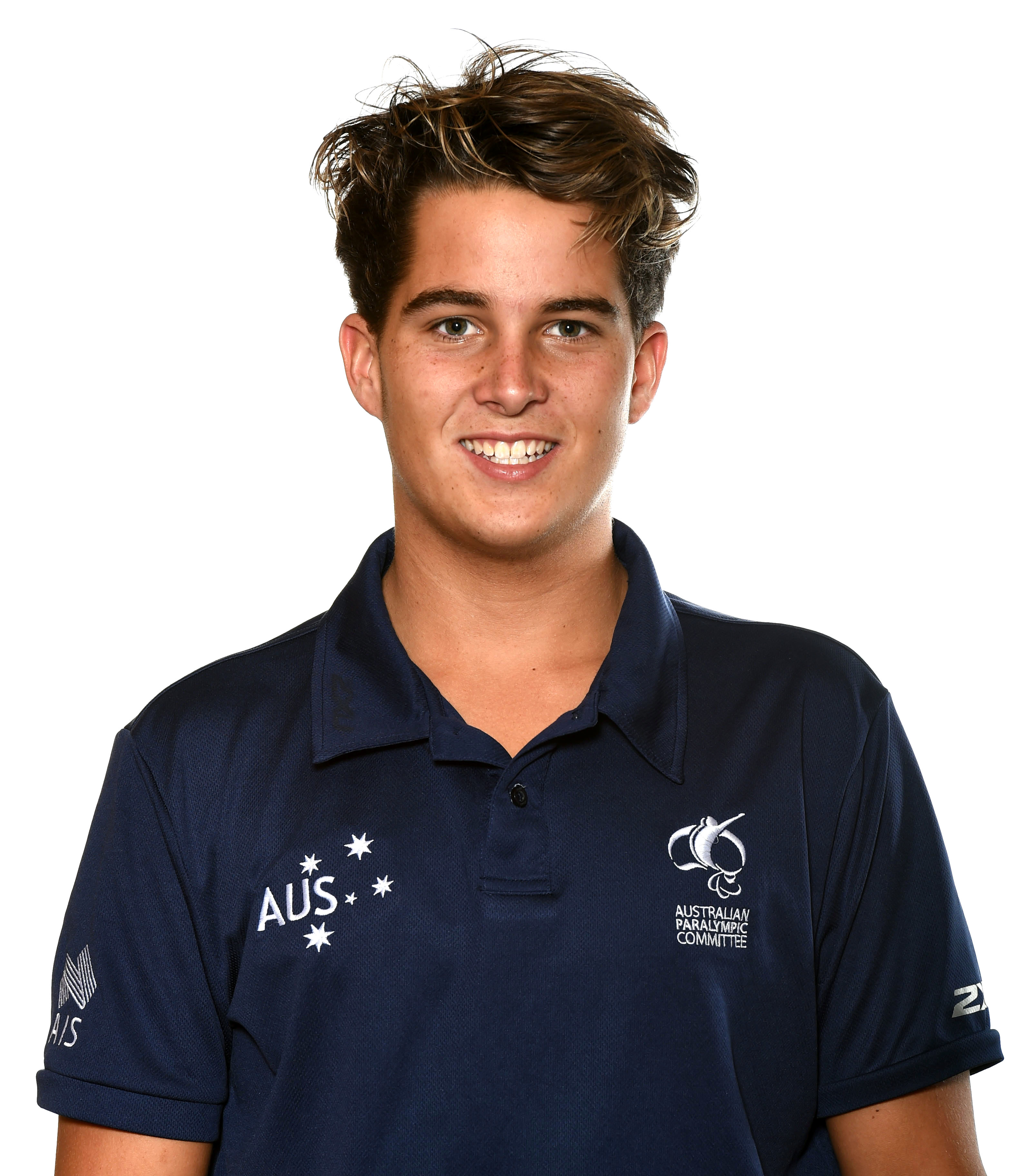
- 2016 Australian Paralympic team portrait of Logan Powell

Personal information
- Full name: Logan Powell
- Nationality: Australia
- Born: 25 January 1999 (age 27)

Sport
- Sport: Swimming
- Classifications: S9
- Club: USC Spartans
- Coach: Nathan Doyle

Logan Powell (born 25 January 1999) is an Australian Paralympic amputee swimmer. He represented Australia at the 2016 Rio Paralympics.

== Personal ==
Powell was born on 25 January 1999. He lost his lower right leg in a ride-on lawn mower accident when he was just 18 months old. He has to get a new prosthetic leg every six months whilst growing. Powell grew up in Mackay, Queensland.

== Career ==
Powell started swimming at the age of nine due to the encouragement of his mother, who wanted him to build up upper-body strength and stay healthy. He swam with Pat Wright's swim coach in Mackay. At the 2013 Australian School Championships in Adelaide, he was awarded the Multi-Class Swimmer of the Meet. In 2013, he broke Brenden Hall's state and schools' age records. In early 2014 he moved to the Plane Creek and District Swimming Club and trained with coach Elisha Hunt until his move to Cotton Tree Cyclones on Queensland's Sunshine Coast then on to USC Spartans at 17. At the 2015 Australian Swimming Championships, he made the finals the 200m Freestyle, 50m Backstroke and 100m Backstroke Multi-class events. He moved from Mackay to train with Jan Cameron at the Paralympic high performance program at the University of the Sunshine Coast.

In para-athletics, he has set national junior records in 100m, 200m, discus and long jump.

At the 2016 Rio Paralympics, Powell competed in three events. He placed seventh in Men's 400m Freestyle S9 and eighth in Men's 100m Backstroke S9. He also competed in Men's 100m Butterfly S9 but didn't progress to the finals.
