= Devon Manchester =

New Zealand field hockey player

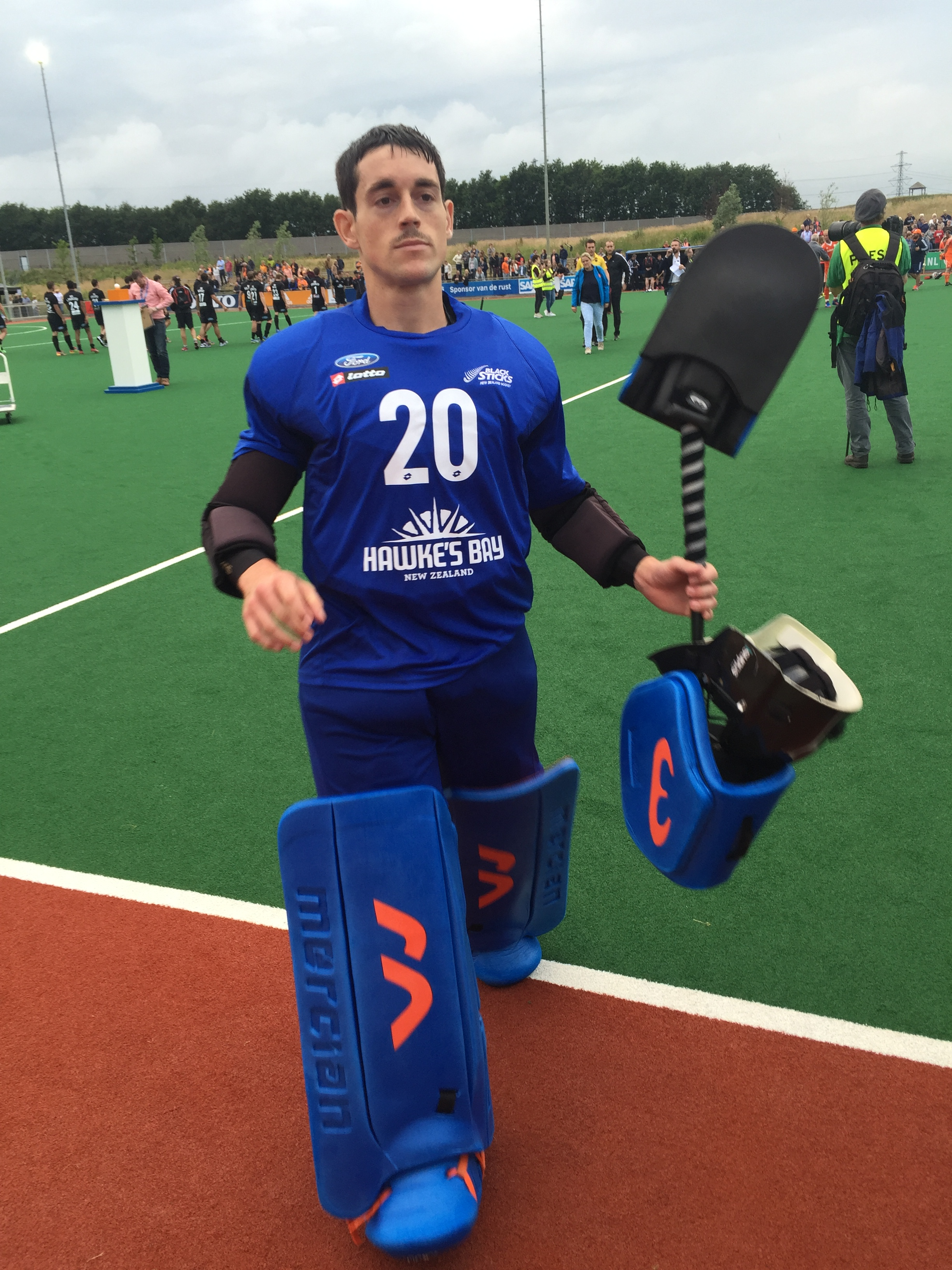
- Interland of the Netherlands against New Zealand on 22 June 2016

Personal information
- Born: 11 November 1989 (age 37) Auckland, New Zealand
- Height: 1.78 m (5 ft 10 in)

Sport
- Sport: Field hockey
National team
Years	Team	Caps	Goals
–	New Zealand		-
Medal record
Men's field hockey
Representing New Zealand
Commonwealth Games
Silver medal – second place	2018 Gold Coast	Team competition
Oceania Cup
Silver medal – second place	2017 Sydney

Devon Manchester (born 11 November 1989) is a New Zealand field hockey player. He represented his country at the 2016 Summer Olympics in Rio de Janeiro, where the men's team came seventh.
