= Richard Joyce (field hockey) =

New Zealand field hockey player

Personal information
- Full name: Richard Kyle John Joyce
- Born: 30 July 1992 (age 34) North Shore, New Zealand
- Height: 1.89 m (6 ft 2 in)
- Weight: 88 kg (194 lb)

Sport
- Sport: Field hockey
- Position: Goalkeeper
- Club: Racing
Senior career
Years	Team	Caps	Goals
2014–2018	North Harbour	-	-
2020–present	Racing	-	-
National team
Years	Team	Caps	Goals
2012–2013	New Zealand U21	6	(0)
2014–present	New Zealand	86	(0)
Medal record
Men's field hockey
Representing New Zealand
Commonwealth Games
Silver medal – second place	2018 Gold Coast	Team
Oceania Cup
Silver medal – second place	2017 Sydney
Silver medal – second place	2019 Rockhampton
- Updated on 11 October 2020

Richard Kyle John Joyce (born 30 July 1992) is a New Zealand field hockey player who plays as a goalkeeper for Belgian club Racing Club de Bruxelles and the New Zealand national team.

== Personal life ==
Richard Joyce was born and raised in North Shore, New Zealand.

== Club career ==
In the New Zealand National Hockey League, Joyce played for the North Harbour men's team. He joined Racing Club de Bruxelles in the Belgian Hockey League for the 2020–21 season.

== International career ==
=== Under-21 ===
Richard Joyce made his debut for the New Zealand under-21 team in 2012, at the Sultan of Johor Cup in Johor Bahru.

The following year in 2013, Joyce represented the team at the Junior World Cup in New Delhi. At the tournament, the team finished seventh.

=== Black Sticks ===
In 2014, Richard Joyce debuted for the New Zealand senior international team, the 'Black Sticks', during a test series against Japan in Wellington.

Joyce claimed his first major medal for New Zealand in 2017, winning silver at the Oceania Cup in Sydney. He followed this up with silver medals at the 2018 Commonwealth Games on the Gold Coast, and again at the Oceania Cup in 2019 in Rockhampton.
