= Natasha Hansen =

New Zealand Olympic cyclist

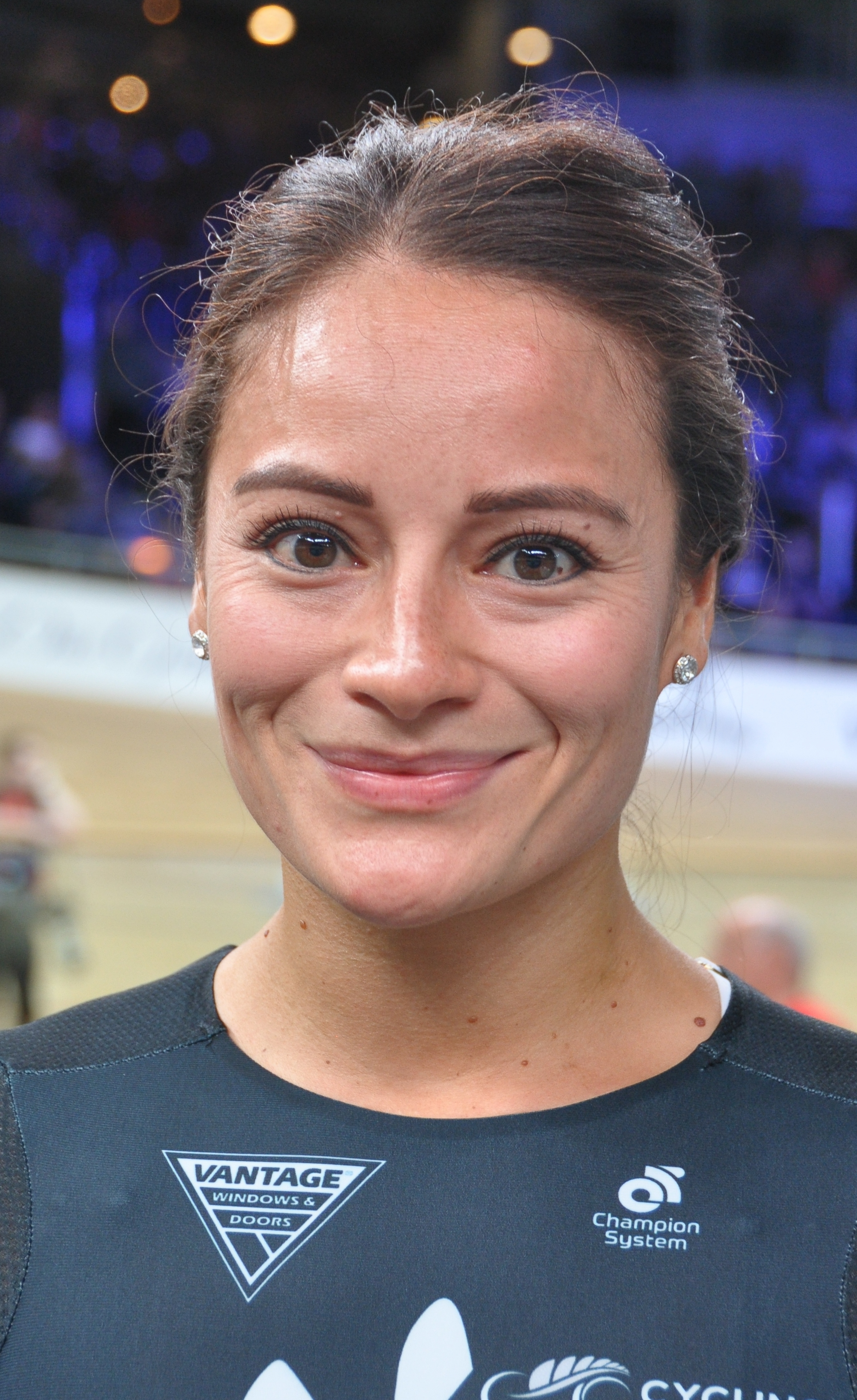
- Hansen in 2020

Personal information
- Born: 15 November 1989 (age 37) Takapuna, New Zealand
- Height: 167 cm (5 ft 6 in)
- Weight: 62 kg (137 lb)

Cycling career
- Sport: Cycling
- Discipline: Track
Medal record
Representing New Zealand
Women's track cycling
Commonwealth Games
Silver medal – second place	2018 Gold Coast	Team sprint
Silver medal – second place	2018 Gold Coast	Sprint
Bronze medal – third place	2018 Gold Coast	Keirin
UCI Track Cycling World Cup
Gold medal – first place	2019 Cambridge	Team Sprint
UCI Track Cycling World Cup
Bronze medal – third place	2017 Los Angeles	Keirin
UCI Track Cycling World Cup
Silver medal – second place	2017 Santiago	Keirin

Natasha Hansen (born 15 November 1989) is a New Zealand track cyclist who has represented her country at the 2012 and 2016 Summer Olympics. Hansen competed at the 2018 Gold Coast games and won two silver medals in the sprint & team sprint, and a bronze in the keirin.

== Early life ==
Hansen was born in 1989 in Takapuna on Auckland's North Shore and is of Samoan descent. She grew up in Canterbury and played netball and was in the Canterbury Flames wider squad, including trials at the national secondary level. Her motivation for taking up track cycling during secondary school was to increase her fitness for netball.

== Career ==
At her second national trials, she set new national records in sprint and 500 m, which qualified her for the 2007 UCI Juniors World Championships held in Aguascalientes, Mexico. This was her first international event and gained her a training place in World Cycling Centre in the French speaking part of Switzerland, to where she moved. Hansen moved back to New Zealand in the following year (2008) and moved to Invercargill to train at the ILT Velodrome, then the base of the New Zealand cycling team. During her time there in the Southland city, she trained as an air traffic controller at Invercargill Airport. At the 2011 Oceania Cycling Championships, she gained titles in team sprint, keirin, and the 500 m event. This secured her a place at the 2012 Summer Olympics for the keirin and the sprint. Her preparation was distracted by her best friend dying of cancer, and Hansen returned to New Zealand in July 2012 for the funeral. She came 12th in the sprint and 11th in the Keirin.

She took 2013 off from competitive cycling and looked for another opportunity to keep herself fit. She took up boxing to train for a charity event in Christchurch. She competed in 'Fight for Christchurch 2013' in November, raising funds for the Ronald McDonald House South Island. The event itself raised in excess of $200,000 for selected charities.

Hansen regained her motivation for track cycling and moved to Cambridge on 1 January 2015; the national team had relocated to the Avantidrome when it officially opened in April 2014. At the same time, she relocated to Hamilton Airport for work. She teamed up with Katie Schofield for the team sprint and came fourth at a World Cup meeting in Cali, Colombia, in January 2015. Hansen was competing with Schofield and Stephanie McKenzie for selection for the 2016 Rio Olympics when she came fifth in the individual sprint in March 2016 at the 2016 UCI Track Cycling World Championships in London, and this performance secured her place at her second Olympics. Hansen was confirmed by the New Zealand Olympic Committee as part of the first track cyclists chosen for Rio on 7 April 2016. The remainder of the team was confirmed in July, and that included Olivia Podmore who was the other half of the sprint team. Hansen and Podmore did not survive the qualification round in the team sprint.

At the 2018 Commonwealth Games, Hansen won the silver medal in the individual sprint and bronze in the keirin, and was part of the New Zealand team (with Emma Cumming) that won silver in the team sprint.

Outside of sport, Hansen is a licensed air traffic controller.

== Career results ==
2015
1st Sprint, Champions of Sprint
Oceania Track Championships

2nd Keirin
2nd Team Sprint (with Katie Schofield)
2nd 500m Time Trial
3rd Sprint

Festival of Speed

2nd Keirin
2nd Sprint

2016
2nd Team Sprint, GP von Deutschland im Sprint (with Olivia Podmore)
2017
ITS Melbourne – DISC Grand Prix

2nd Keirin
3rd Sprint

3rd Sprint, Oceania Track Championships
2018
Commonwealth Games

2nd Team Sprint
2nd Sprint
3rd Keirin
