= Jessica Bygate =

New Zealand basketball player

Jess Bygate
No. 2 – Melbourne Boomers
- Position: Forward
- League: WNBL

Personal information
- Born: 10 January 1992 (age 34) Pahiatua, New Zealand
- Listed height: 6 ft 1 in (1.85 m)

Career information
- College: Dickinson State (2012–2014)
- Playing career: 2011–present

Career history
- 2015–2016: Adelaide Lightning (Australia)
- 2016: Melbourne Boomers (Australia)

Career highlights
- New Zealand WBC Champion (2012)
Medals
Representing New Zealand
Women's basketball
Commonwealth Games
| Bronze medal – third place | 2018 Gold Coast | Team competition |
FIBA Oceania Championships
| Silver medal – second place | 2013 Australia / New Zealand | Team |
| Silver medal – second place | 2015 Australia / New Zealand | Team |

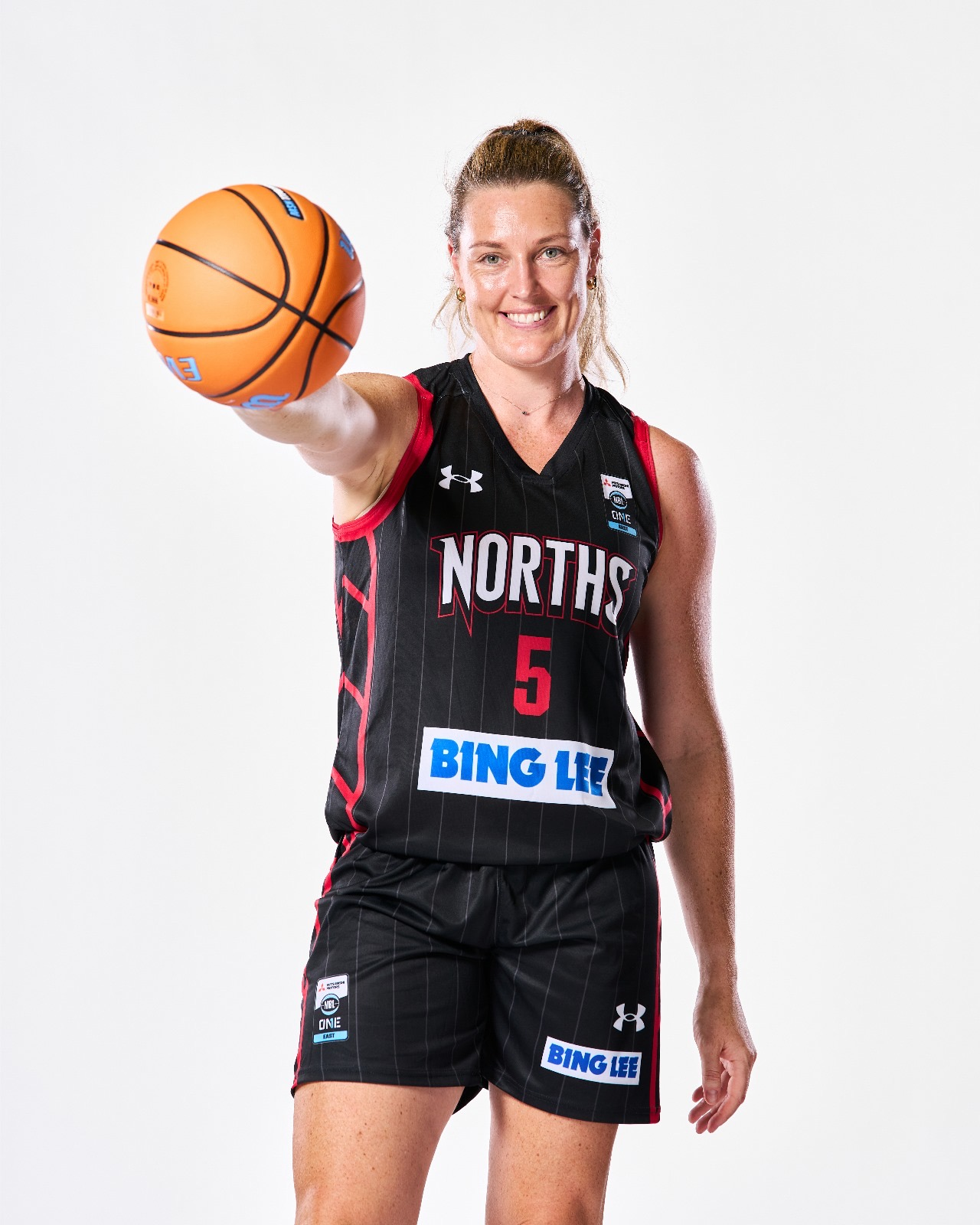
Jess Bygate Norths

Jessica Rose Bygate (born 10 January 1992) is a former professional basketball player from New Zealand. She has played for the Melbourne Boomers in the WNBL and now lives is New South Wales. She now works in the sports management and operations industry.

== Early life ==
Bygate grew up in Nelson and received her secondary education at Nelson College for Girls. After school, she attended Lincoln University for a year.

== Professional career ==
=== WBC ===
Bygate began her career in New Zealand, playing for the Nelson Sparks, and later the Canterbury Wildcats in the WBC. She won her first WBC championship and MVP. She then spent a season for the Junior Tall Ferns, before moving to the Australian leagues.

=== College ===
Bygate began her college career in 2011 at Moberly Area Community College in Moberly, Missouri. Impressive showings earned her a transfer to Dickinson State University in Dickinson, North Dakota where she would play for the Dickinson State Blue Hawks.

=== Australia ===
After a season with the Gladstone Power in the Queensland Basketball League, Bygate was signed by WNBL side, Adelaide Lightning for the 2015–16 season. Bygate was then signed for the 2016–17 season by the Melbourne Boomers.

She played multiple seasons in the NBL1, most recently for Norths. Winning the NBL1 East championship in 2023, the team was also runners up at the NBL1 Nationals in 2023.

== National team ==
At the 2013 FIBA Oceania Championship for Women Bygate made her international debut where she won a silver medal as part of the Tall Ferns New Zealand women's basketball team.
