= Olivia Podmore =

New Zealand cyclist (1997–2021)

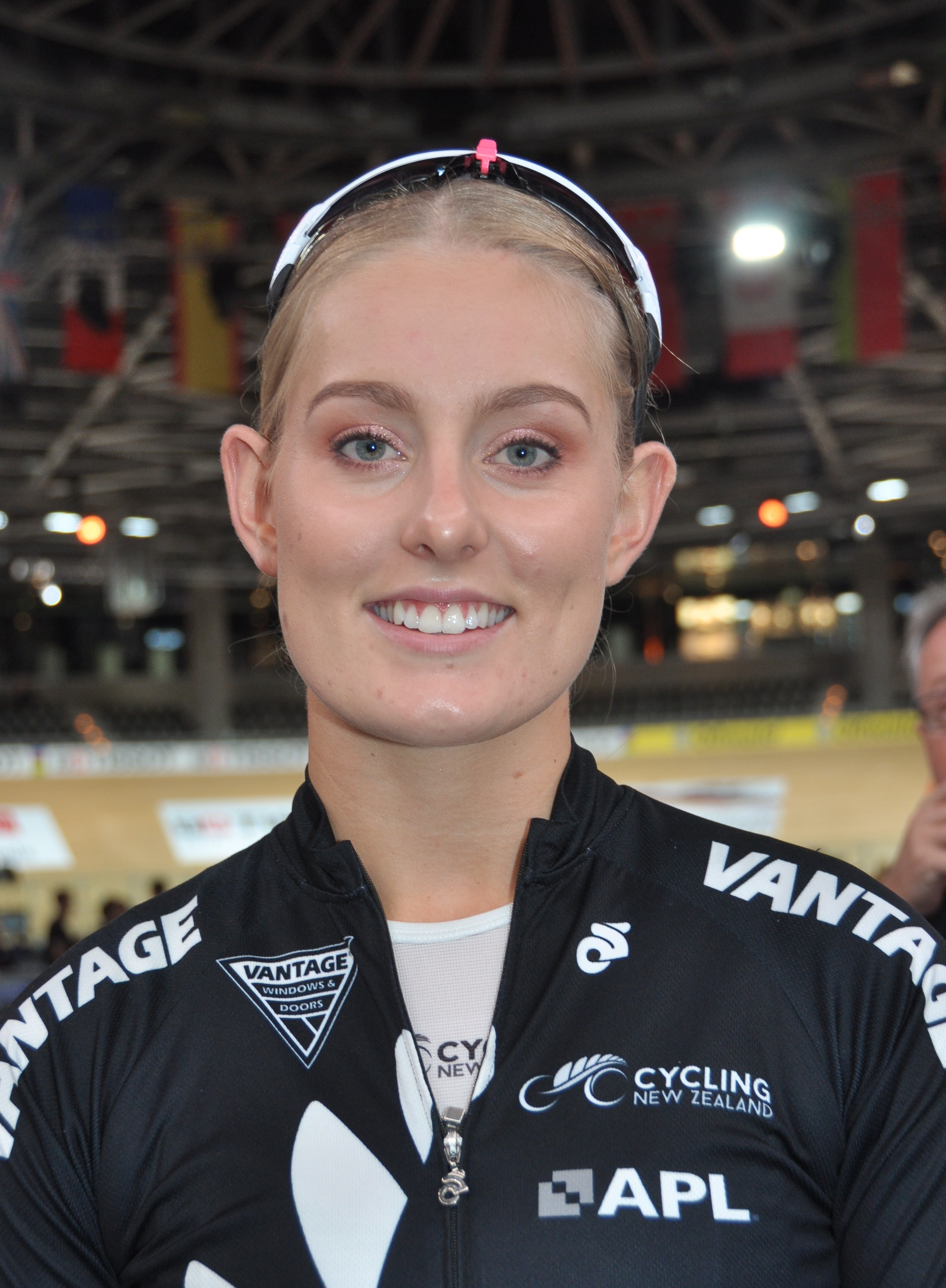
- Podmore in February 2020

Personal information
- Born: 24 May 1997 Christchurch, New Zealand
- Died: 9 August 2021 (aged 24) Cambridge, Waikato, New Zealand
- Height: 174 cm (5 ft 9 in)

Cycling career
- Sport: Cycling
- Role: Rider

Olivia Rose Podmore (24 May 1997 – 9 August 2021) was a New Zealand professional racing cyclist. She represented her country at the 2016 Summer Olympics and the 2018 Commonwealth Games.

== Early life ==
Born in Christchurch in 1997, Olivia was the daughter of Philip and Nienke (née Tabak) Podmore. She had one elder brother, Mitchell. She was educated at Middleton Grange School.

Her great-grandfather, Cornelis Gerardus Tabak, was an Olympic weightlifter for Holland in the 1928 Amsterdam Games.

== Career ==
Podmore started out cycling in BMX at age nine, later moving to road cycling and then to track cycling.

In 2015, Podmore moved to Cambridge in Waikato to train with the national cycling team. That year, Podmore won silver alongside Emma Cumming in the team sprint and bronze in the time trial at the Junior Track World Championships in Astana.

Podmore rode in the women's team sprint event at the 2016 UCI Track Cycling World Championships. She also competed at the 2016 Rio Olympics, although she and her teammate Natasha Hansen did not advance from the qualification round in the team sprint. They finished ninth in the event. She crashed in the keirin event at the games and finished 25th in the event. She also came 23rd in the heats of the individual sprint event at the games.

In 2017, Podmore was the New Zealand keirin champion. At that year's Oceania Track Championships, Podmore came second in the 500 metres time trial event, and she came second alongside Emma Cumming in the team sprint event. She competed for New Zealand at the 2018 Commonwealth Games in Gold Coast, Australia. She was eliminated in the quarter-finals of the individual sprint competition and came sixth in the keirin event at the games. She won the 500 metres time trial event at the 2019 Oceania Track Cycling Championships and competed in the team sprint event at the 2019 UCI Track Cycling World Championships. She competed in the same event at the 2020 Championships.

Podmore reached the qualification criteria for the delayed 2020 Summer Olympics but was not selected by the New Zealand Olympic Committee.

== Death ==
Podmore died in Cambridge on the evening of 9 August 2021, aged 24. Her death is a suspected suicide and was referred to the coroner. Hours before her death, she posted on Instagram about the pressures of high-performance sport. Podmore's funeral was held in Christchurch on 13 August 2021. She was buried in Christchurch's Yaldhurst cemetery.

In September 2021, Cycling New Zealand and High Performance Sport New Zealand (HPSNZ) appointed former New Zealand solicitor-general, Mike Herron QC, and Professor Sarah Leberman MNZM to co-chair an inquiry. Also sitting on the panel were Dr. Lesley Nicol ONZM and rowing Olympic medalist Genevieve Macky. The terms of reference of the inquiry included:

1. assessing the adequacy of the implementation of the recommendations from the 2018 Heron Report; identification of areas of further improvement that would ensure the wellbeing of athletes, coaches, support staff and others involved in Cycling New Zealand’s high performance programme are a top priority within the environment;
2. assessment of the support offered to athletes at critical points within Cycling New Zealand’s high performance programme (by both Cycling New Zealand and HPSNZ), with a particular emphasis on induction, selection and exit transitions;
3. assessment of the impact that HPSNZ investment and engagement has on Cycling New Zealand’s high performance programme;
4. assessment of the impacts of high performance programmes which require elite athletes to be in one location for most of the year, with a particular focus on Cambridge; and
5. an understanding of what steps can be taken to improve current and future practices, policies and governance of Cycling New Zealand’s high performance programme with a view to ensuring the safety, wellbeing and empowerment of all individuals within that environment.
