= Emma Cumming =

New Zealand cyclist (born 1998)

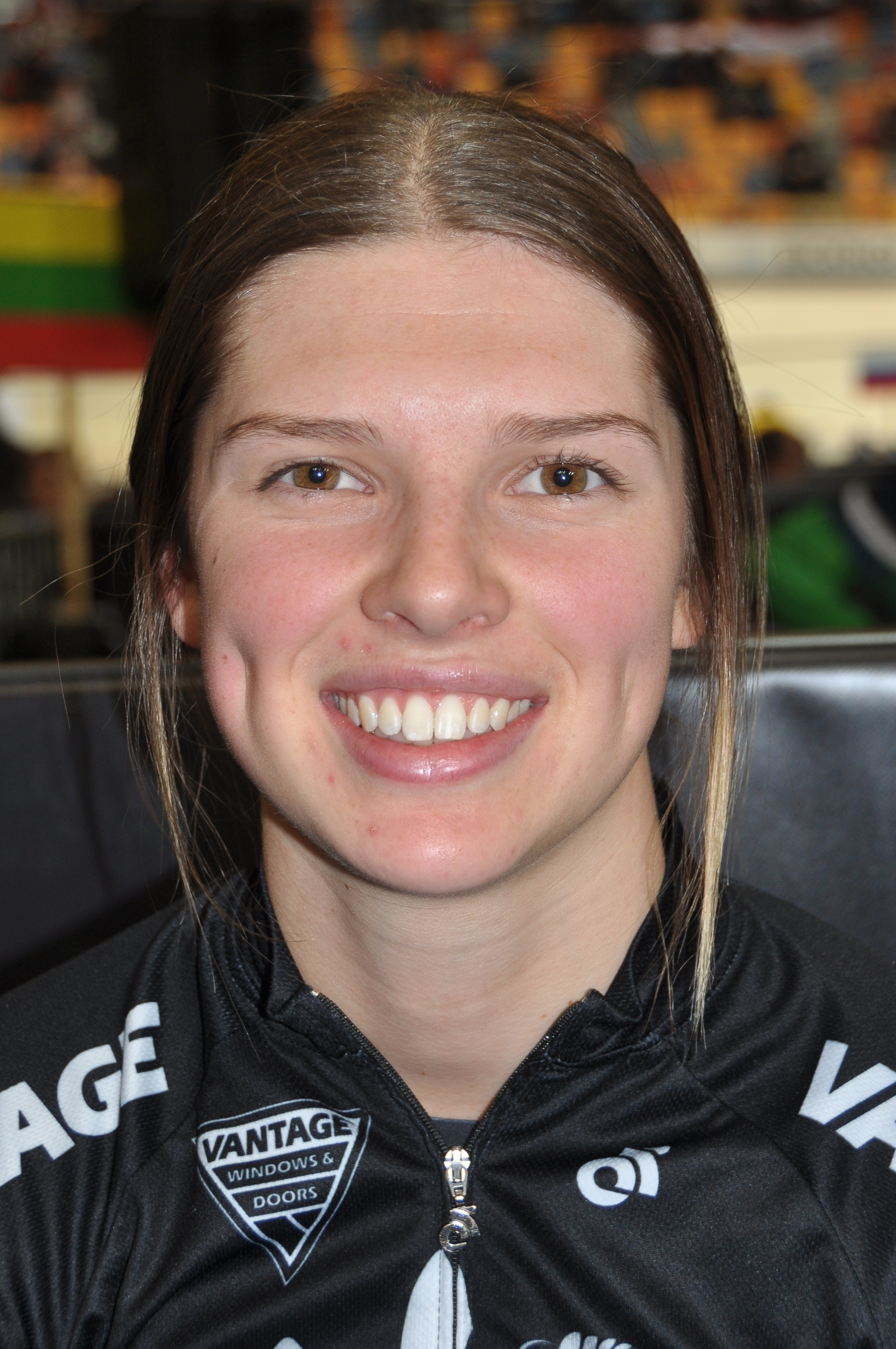
- Emma Cumming in 2018

Personal information
- Born: 20 February 1998 (age 28) Invercargill, New Zealand
- Height: 1.69 m (5 ft 7 in)

Cycling career
- Sport: Cycling
- Role: Rider
Medal record
Women's track cycling
Commonwealth Games
| Silver medal – second place | 2018 Gold Coast | Team sprint |
| Bronze medal – third place | 2018 Gold Coast | 500m time trial |
UCI Juniors Track World Championships
| Gold medal – first place | 2016 Aigle | Team sprint |
| Silver medal – second place | 2015 Astana | Team sprint |

Emma Cumming (born 20 February 1998) is a New Zealand racing cyclist. She represented her country at the 2018 Commonwealth Games, claiming the silver medal in the team sprint (with Natasha Hansen) and the bronze medal in the track time trial.

== Biography ==
Cumming was born at Southland (Kew) Hospital in Invercargill in 1998. She was educated at Southland Girls' High School.

At the 2015 Junior Track World Championships, Cumming won silver alongside Olivia Podmore in the team sprint. A year later at the 2016 Junior Track World Championships, she won gold alongside Ellesse Andrews in the team sprint.

Cumming rode in the women's team sprint event at the 2018 UCI Track Cycling World Championships.

At the 2018 Commonwealth Games, Cumming competed in the individual sprint, team sprint, keirin and time trial. She claimed the silver medal in the team sprint with Natasha Hansen, and the bronze medal in thetime trial.

In mid-2018, Cumming tore her left acetabular labrum and developed tendonitis in her hip abductor muscles. She required hip surgery which sidelined her for the 2019 season.
