= Georgia Marris =

New Zealand swimmer (born 1996)

Personal information
- Born: November 15, 1996 (age 29) North Shore, New Zealand

Sport
- Sport: Swimming
- College team: Florida Gators

Georgia Marris (born 15 November 1996) is a New Zealand swimmer. In 2018 she is competing in the 2018 Commonwealth Games in the 100m butterfly event.

Marris was born and grew up on the North Shore, Auckland. She began learning to swim from 6 months old, and from the age of three had lessons with New Zealand swimming representative, Phillipa Gower (née Gould). Marris first competed for New Zealand at the 2012 Trans-Tasman Tri Series, followed by the Australian Youth Olympic Festival in 2013.

She has broken a number of New Zealand age group short course records including 13 years 100m freestyle, 16 years 200m freestyle and 17 years 100m freestyle. In 2015 and 2017 she competed at the World University Games.

She is currently based in the United States where she has a scholarship at the University of Florida.
