= Ukraine at the 2020 Summer Olympics =

- IOC code: UKR
- NOC: National Olympic Committee of Ukraine
- Website: www.noc-ukr.org (in Ukrainian and English)

in Tokyo, Japan 23 July 2021 – 8 August 2021
- Competitors: 155 in 20 sports
- Flag bearers (opening): Olena Kostevych; Bohdan Nikishyn
- Flag bearer (closing): Liudmyla Luzan
- Medals Ranked 44th: Gold 1 Silver 6 Bronze 12 Total 19

Summer Olympics appearances (overview)
- 1996; 2000; 2004; 2008; 2012; 2016; 2020; 2024; 2028

Other related appearances
- Austria (1896–1912); Hungary (1896–1912); Russian Empire (1900–1912); Czechoslovakia (1920–1936); Poland (1924–1936); Romania (1924–1936); Soviet Union (1952–1988); Unified Team (1992)

Ukraine competed at the 2020 Summer Olympics in Tokyo. Originally scheduled to take place from 24 July to 9 August 2020, the Games were postponed to 23 July to 8 August 2021, due to the worldwide COVID-19 pandemic. It was the nation's seventh consecutive appearance at the Summer Olympics in the post-Soviet era with its smallest representation ever.

Ukraine racked up 19 medals in Tokyo, a significant improvement over its 2016 output of 11 medals, which was the lowest to date. However, the country managed to clinch only a single gold, its worst result in history by that parameter.

== Medalists ==
Medal	Name	Sport	Event	Date
Gold	Zhan Beleniuk	Wrestling	Men's Greco-Roman 87 kg	4 August
Silver	Mykhailo Romanchuk	Swimming	Men's 1500 metre freestyle	1 August
Silver	Parviz Nasibov	Wrestling	Men's Greco-Roman 67 kg	4 August
Silver	Anzhelika Terliuga	Karate	Women's 55 kg	5 August
Silver	Liudmyla Luzan; Anastasiia Chetverikova	Canoeing	Women's C-2 500 metres	7 August
Silver	Oleksandr Khyzhniak	Boxing	Men's middleweight	7 August
Silver	Olena Starikova	Cycling	Women's sprint	8 August
Bronze	Daria Bilodid	Judo	Women's 48 kg	24 July
Bronze	Ihor Reizlin	Fencing	Men's épée	25 July
Bronze	Olena Kostevych; Oleh Omelchuk	Shooting	Mixed 10 metre air pistol team	27 July
Bronze	Mykhailo Romanchuk	Swimming	Men's 800 metre freestyle	29 July
Bronze	Elina Svitolina	Tennis	Women's singles	31 July
Bronze	Alla Cherkasova	Wrestling	Women's freestyle 68 kg	3 August
Bronze	Marta Fiedina; Anastasiya Savchuk	Artistic swimming	Women's duet	4 August
Bronze	Iryna Koliadenko	Wrestling	Women's freestyle 62 kg	4 August
Bronze	Liudmyla Luzan	Canoeing	Women's C-1 200 metres	5 August
Bronze	Stanislav Horuna	Karate	Men's 75 kg	6 August
Bronze	Maryna Aleksiiva; Vladyslava Aleksiiva; Marta Fiedina; Kateryna Reznik; Anastasiya Savchuk; Alina Shynkarenko; Kseniya Sydorenko; Yelyzaveta Yakhno	Artistic swimming	Women's team	7 August
Bronze	Yaroslava Mahuchikh	Athletics	Women's high jump	7 August

Medals by sport
Sport	1st place, gold medalist(s)	2nd place, silver medalist(s)	3rd place, bronze medalist(s)	Total
Artistic swimming	0	0	2	2
Athletics	0	0	1	1
Boxing	0	1	0	1
Canoeing	0	1	1	2
Cycling	0	1	0	1
Fencing	0	0	1	1
Judo	0	0	1	1
Karate	0	1	1	2
Shooting	0	0	1	1
Swimming	0	1	1	2
Tennis	0	0	1	1
Wrestling	1	1	2	4
Total	1	6	12	19

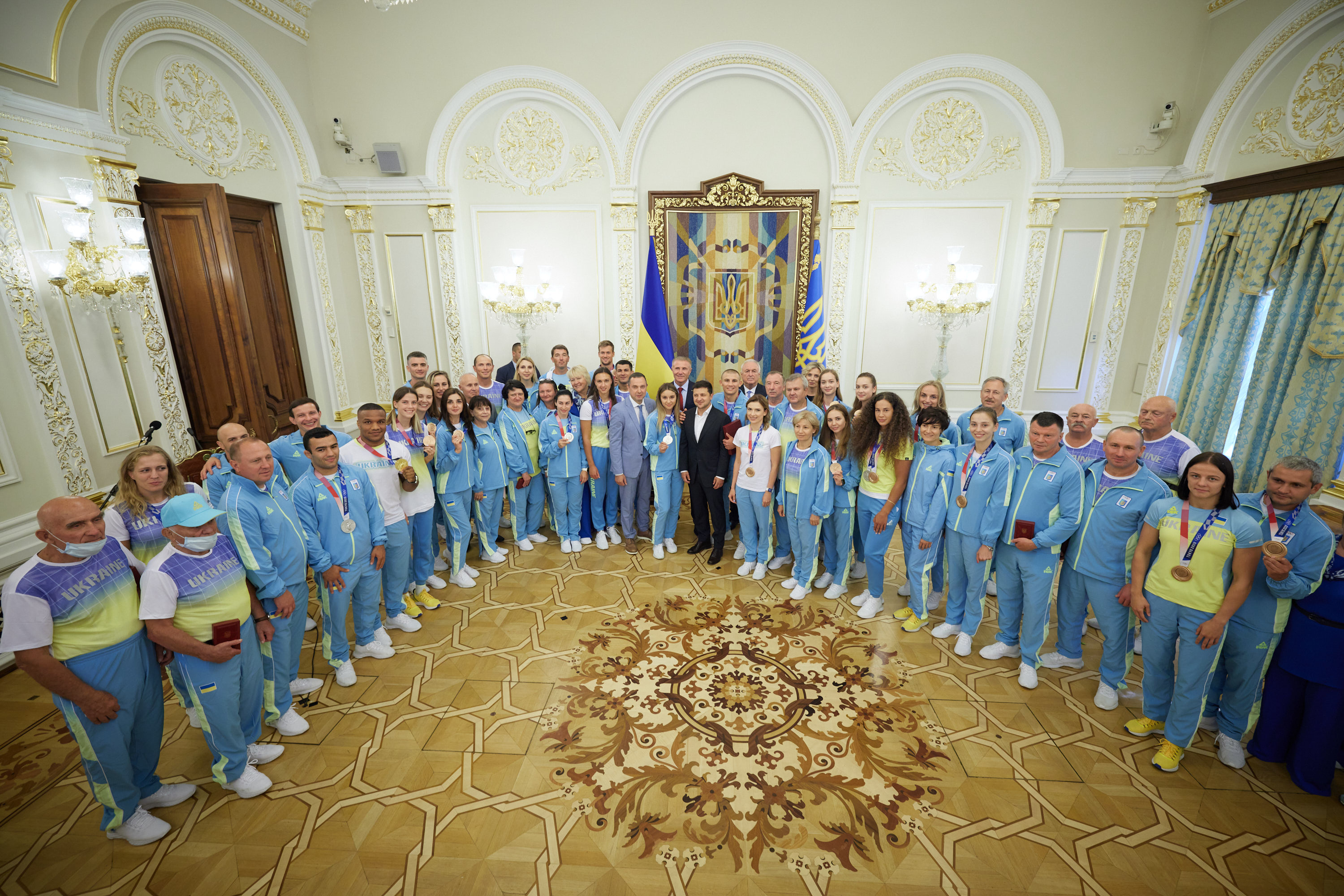
The Olympic medalists and their coaches at the Office of the President of Ukraine in August 2021

== Competitors ==
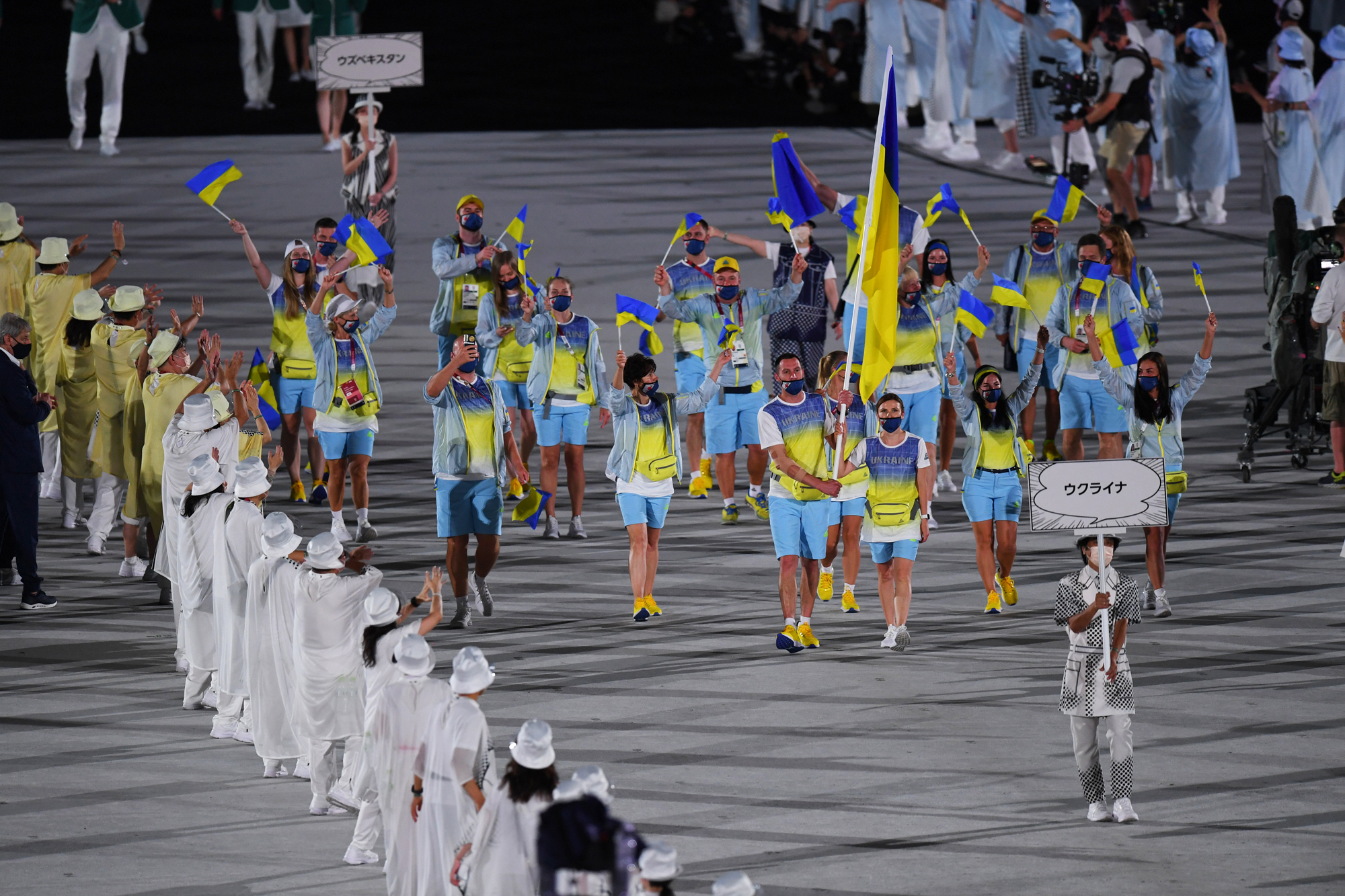
Ukraine at the 2020 Summer Olympics opening ceremony

The following is the list of number of competitors in the Games.

Sport	Men	Women	Total
Archery	1	3	4
Artistic swimming	—N/a	8	8
Athletics	19	25	44
Badminton	1	1	2
Boxing	5	1	6
Canoeing	2	9	11
Cycling	1	4	5
Diving	3	4	7
Equestrian	1	1	2
Fencing	4	2	6
Gymnastics	6	8	14
Judo	4	3	7
Karate	1	2	3
Modern pentathlon	1	1	2
Rowing	2	0	2
Shooting	4	2	6
Swimming	7	2	9
Table tennis	1	2	3
Tennis	0	5	5
Triathlon	0	1	1
Weightlifting	0	2	2
Wrestling	5	5	10
Total	66	89	155

== Archery ==
Three Ukrainian archers qualified for the women's events by reaching the quarterfinal stage of the women's team recurve at the 2019 World Archery Championships in 's-Hertogenbosch, Netherlands.

Athlete	Event	Ranking round		Round of 64	Round of 32	Round of 16	Quarterfinals	Semifinals	Final / BM	
Athlete	Event	Score	Seed	Opposition Score	Opposition Score	Opposition Score	Opposition Score	Opposition Score	Opposition Score	Rank
Oleksii Hunbin	Men's individual	656	28	Rai (IND); L 4–6	Did not advance					
Veronika Marchenko	Women's individual	635	35	Lei C-y (TPE); W 6–4	Kang C-y (KOR); L 1–7	Did not advance				
Anastasiia Pavlova	Women's individual	631	41	Mucino-Fernandez (USA); L 4–6	Did not advance					
Lidiia Sichenikova	Women's individual	623	54	Kroppen (GER); L 0–6	Did not advance					
Veronika Marchenko; Anastasiia Pavlova; Lidiia Sichenikova	Women's team	1889	11	—N/a		ROC; L 2–6	Did not advance			
Oleksii Hunbin; Veronika Marchenko	Mixed team	1291	18	—N/a		Did not advance				

== Artistic swimming ==
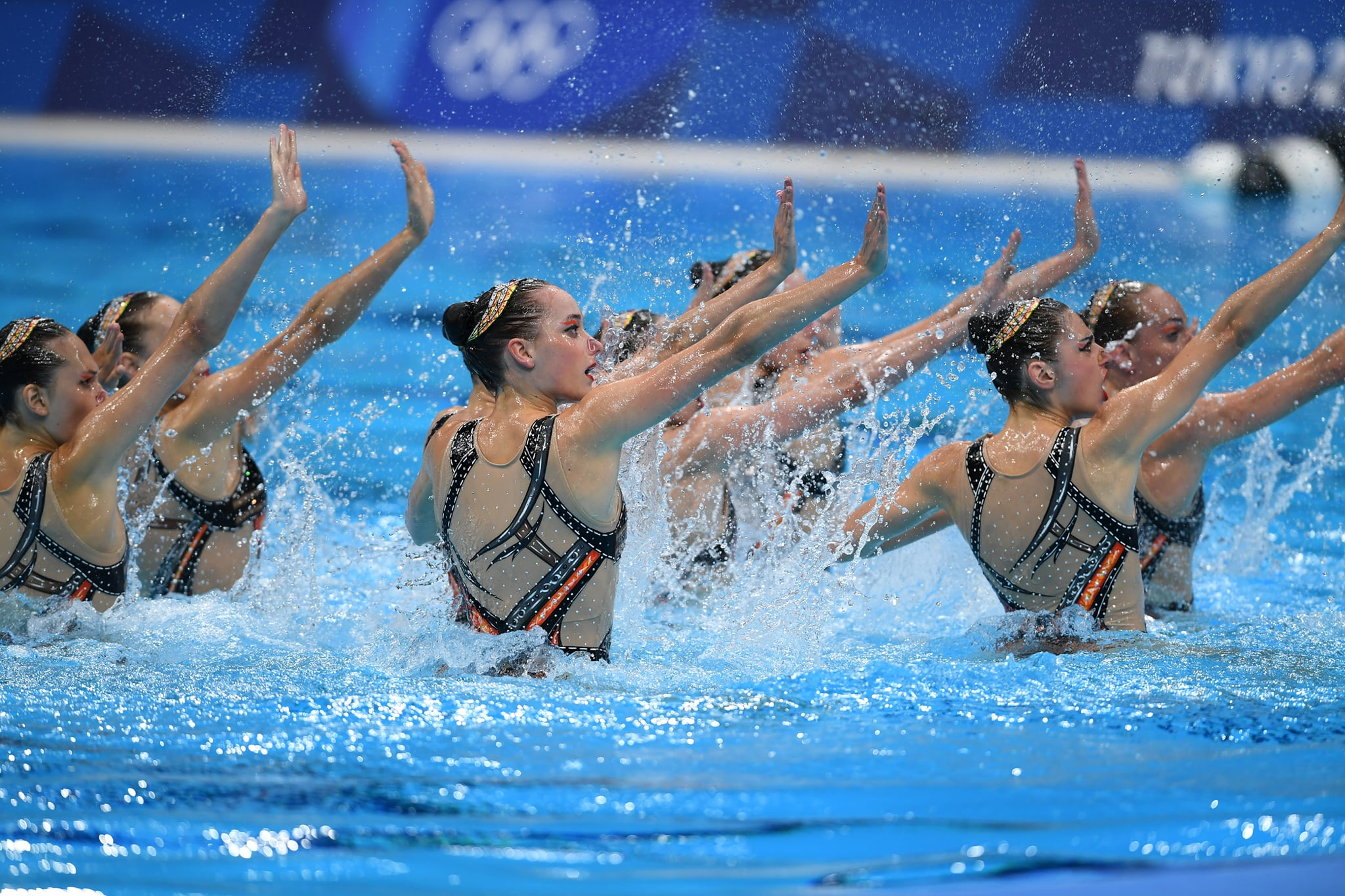
Artistic swimming team performing in the free routine round on 7 August

Ukraine fielded a squad of eight artistic swimmers to compete in the women's duet and team event by obtaining one of two highest-ranked spots, not yet qualified, in the team free routine at the 2019 FINA World Championships in Gwangju, South Korea.

Athlete	Event	Technical routine		Free routine (preliminary)			Free routine (final)		
Athlete	Event	Points	Rank	Points	Total (technical + free)	Rank	Points	Total (technical + free)	Rank
Marta Fiedina; Anastasiya Savchuk	Duet	93.8620	3	94.9333	188.7953	3 Q	95.6000	189.4620	3rd place, bronze medalist(s)
Maryna Aleksiiva; Vladyslava Aleksiiva; Marta Fiedina; Kateryna Reznik; Anastasiya Savchuk; Alina Shynkarenko; Kseniya Sydorenko; Yelyzaveta Yakhno	Team	94.2685	3	—N/a			96.0333	190.3018	3rd place, bronze medalist(s)

== Athletics ==
Ukrainian athletes achieved the entry standards, either by qualifying time or by world ranking, in the following track and field events (up to a maximum of 3 athletes in each event):

Key

- Note–Ranks given for track events are within the athlete's heat only
- Q = Qualified for the next round
- q = Qualified for the next round as a fastest loser or, in field events, by position without achieving the qualifying target
- NR = National record
- N/A = Round not applicable for the event
- Bye = Athlete not required to compete in round

Track & road events
Men

Athlete	Event	Heat		Semifinal		Final	
Athlete	Event	Time	Rank	Time	Rank	Time	Rank
Serhiy Smelyk	200 m	20.53	4	Did not advance			
Bohdan-Ivan Horodyskyy	Marathon	—N/a				DNF	
Mykola Nyzhnyk	Marathon	—N/a				DNF	
Oleksandr Sitkovskyy	Marathon	—N/a				DNF	
Ivan Losev	20 km walk	—N/a				1:33:26	49
Eduard Zabuzhenko	20 km walk	—N/a				1:39:38	52
Ivan Banzeruk	50 km walk	—N/a				DNF	
Valeriy Litanyuk	50 km walk	—N/a				4:14:05	39
Maryan Zakalnytskyy	50 km walk	—N/a				4:02:53	25

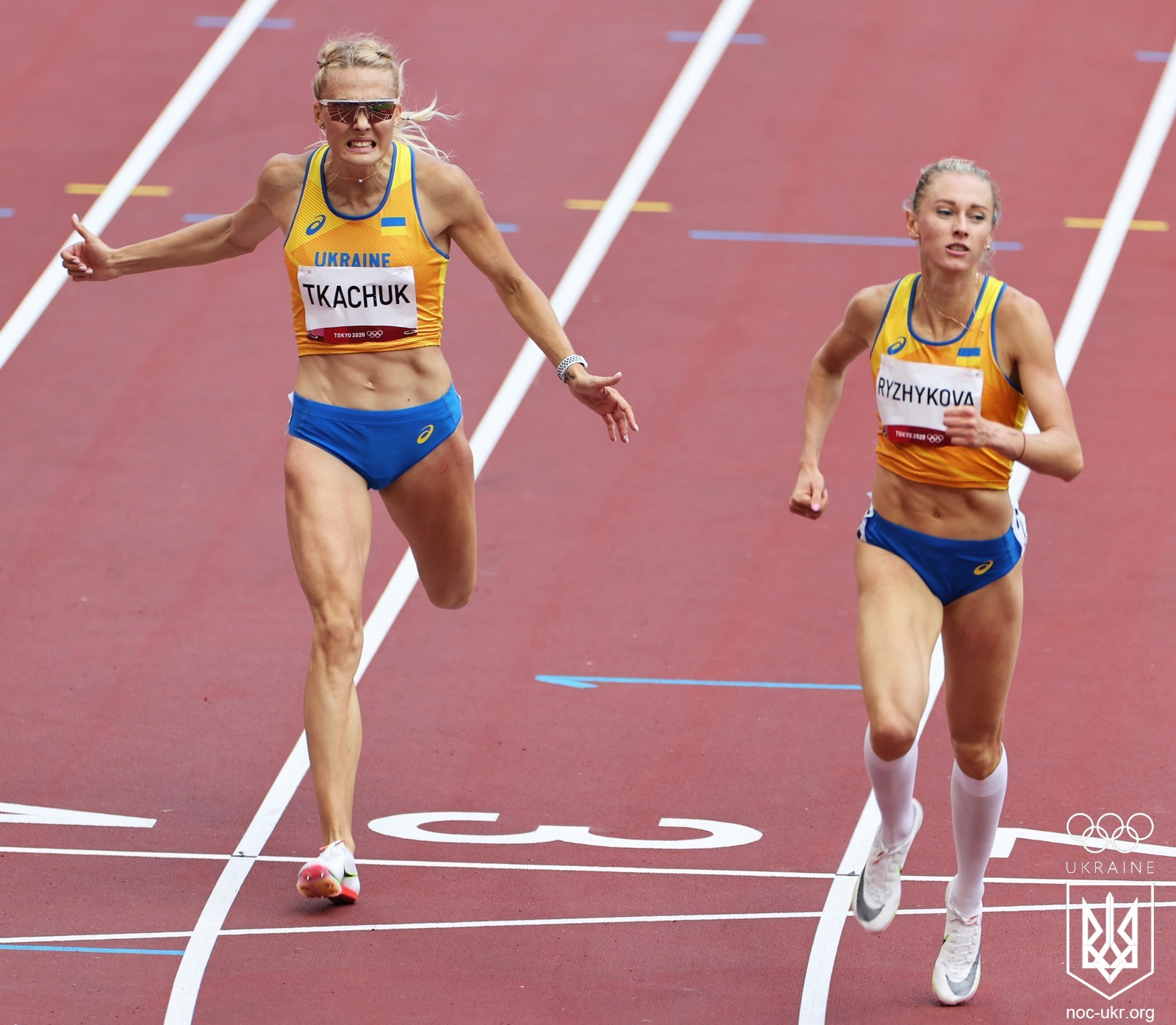
Viktoriya Tkachuk and Anna Ryzhykova in the women's 400 m hurdles final on 4 August

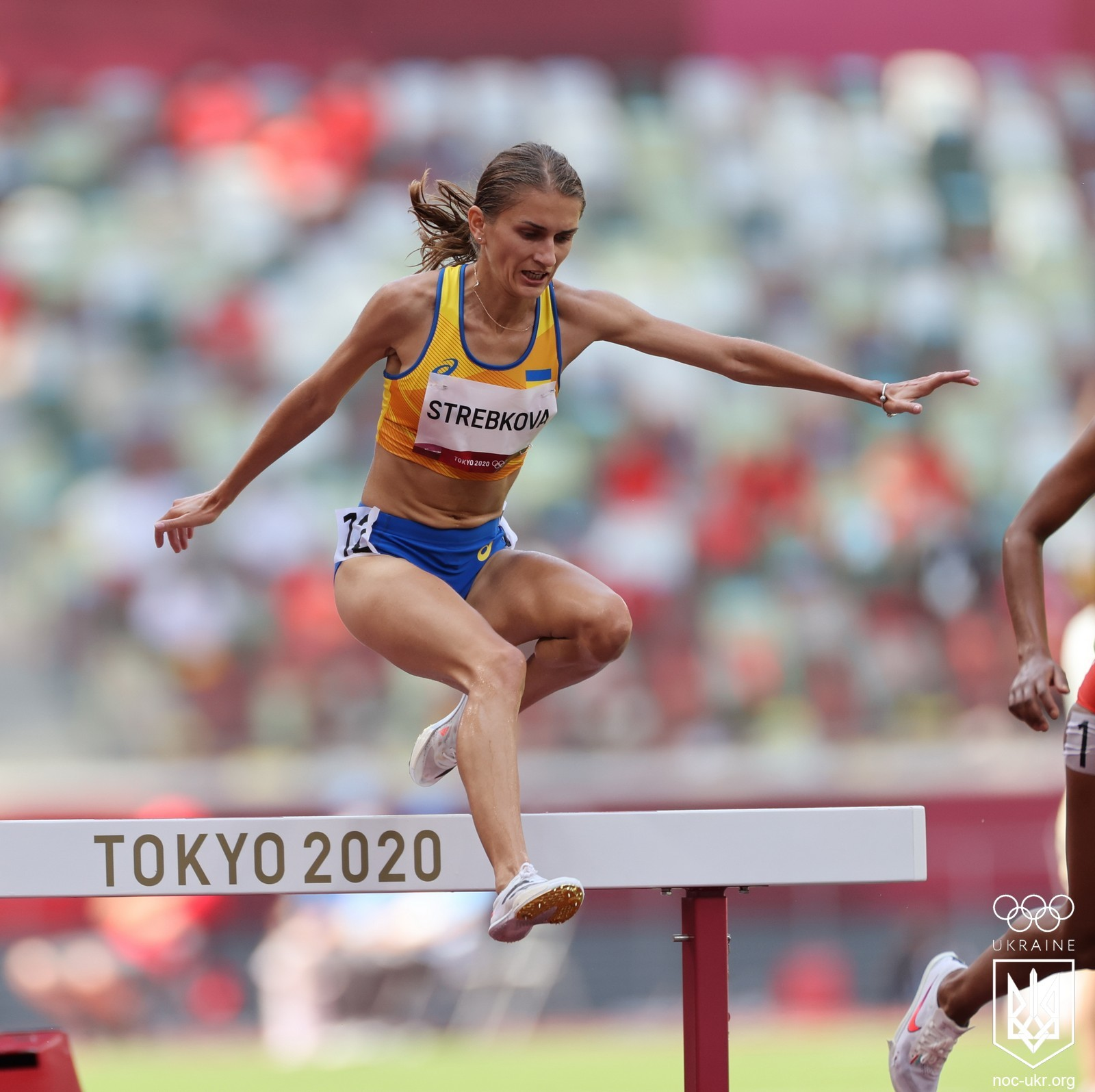
Nataliya Strebkova in the women's 3000 m steeplechase heat 1

Women

Athlete	Event	Heat		Semifinal		Final	
Athlete	Event	Time	Rank	Time	Rank	Time	Rank
Tetyana Melnyk	400 m	54.99	8	Did not advance			
Mariya Mykolenko	400 m hurdles	57.86	6	Did not advance			
Anna Ryzhykova	400 m hurdles	54.56	1 Q	54.23	3 q	53.48	5
Viktoriya Tkachuk	400 m hurdles	54.80	1 Q	54.25	3 q	53.79	6
Nataliya Strebkova	3000 m steeplechase	9:49.15	11	—N/a		Did not advance	
Kateryna Klymyuk; Alina Lohvynenko; Anna Ryzhykova; Viktoriya Tkachuk	4 × 400 m relay	3:24.50	6	—N/a		Did not advance	
Viktoriia Kaliuzhna	Marathon	—N/a				DNF	
Darya Mykhaylova	Marathon	—N/a				DNF	
Yevheniya Prokofyeva	Marathon	—N/a				2:36:47 SB	42
Lyudmyla Olyanovska	20 km walk	—N/a				1:40:20	43
Mariia Sakharuk	20 km walk	—N/a				1:34:04	19
Hanna Shevchuk	20 km walk	—N/a				1:36:27	27

Mixed

Athlete	Event	Heat		Final	
Athlete	Event	Time	Rank	Time	Rank
Mykyta Barabanov; Oleksandr Pohorilko; Kateryna Klymyuk; Alina Lohvynenko	4 × 400 m relay	3:14.21	6	Did not advance	

Field events
Men

Athlete	Event	Qualification		Final	
Athlete	Event	Distance	Position	Distance	Position
Vladyslav Mazur	Long jump	7.60	27	Did not advance	
Andriy Protsenko	High jump	2.25	=14	Did not advance	
Ihor Musiyenko	Shot put	19.56	30	Did not advance	
Mykyta Nesterenko	Discus throw	60.95	20	Did not advance	
Mykhaylo Kokhan	Hammer throw	78.36	5 Q	80.39	4
Hlib Piskunov	Hammer throw	73.84	20	Did not advance	

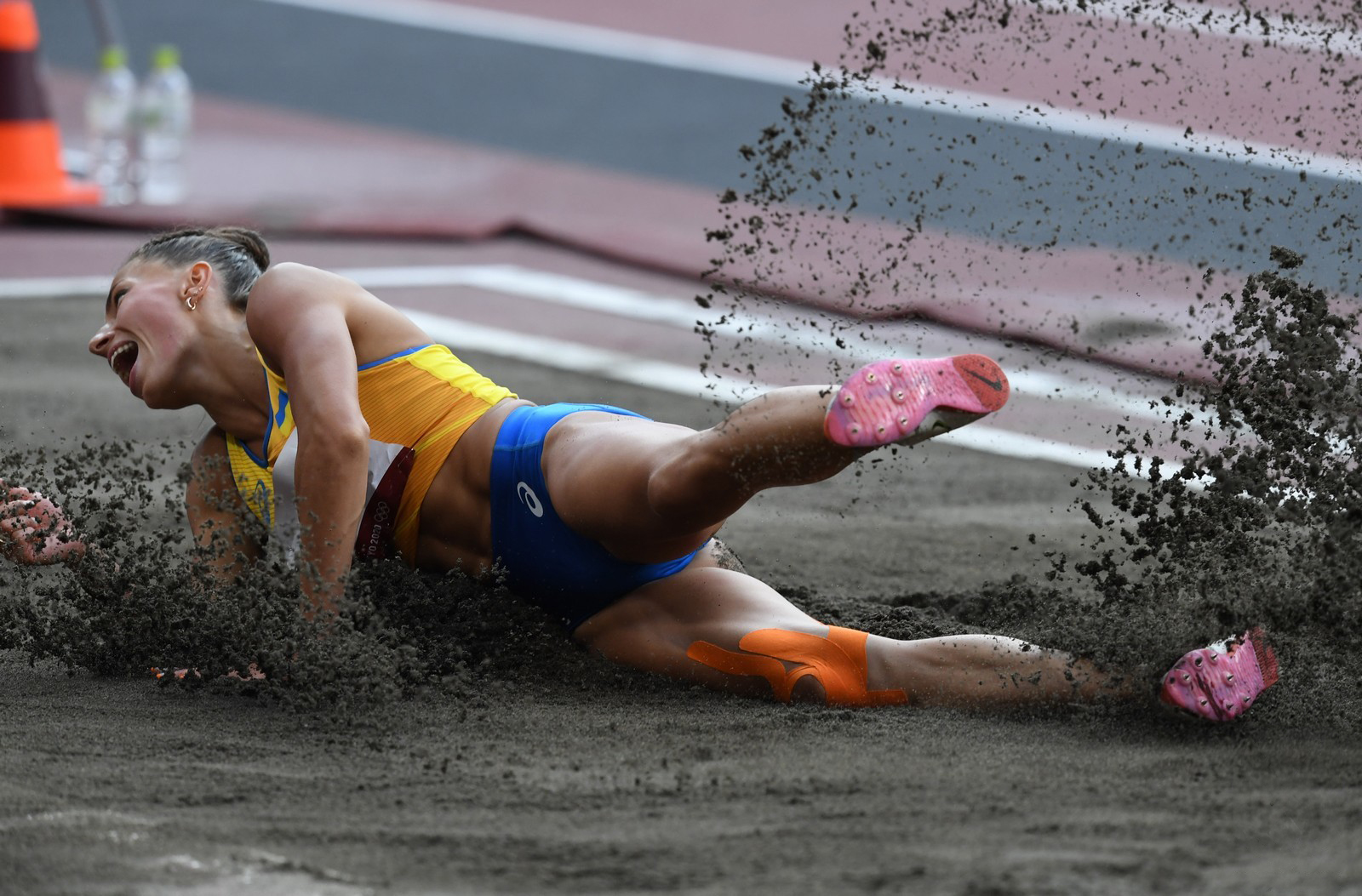
Maryna Bekh-Romanchuk in the women's long jump final

Women

Athlete	Event	Qualification		Final	
Athlete	Event	Distance	Position	Distance	Position
Maryna Bekh-Romanchuk	Long jump	6.71	10 Q	6.88	5
Olha Saladukha	Triple jump	13.91	20	Did not advance	
Iryna Herashchenko	High jump	1.95	=11 Q	1.98 SB	4
Yuliya Levchenko	High jump	1.95	=11 Q	1.96 SB	8
Yaroslava Mahuchikh	High jump	1.95	3 Q	2.00	3rd place, bronze medalist(s)
Yana Hladiychuk	Pole vault	4.40	21	Did not advance	
Maryna Kylypko	Pole vault	4.55	15 q	4.50	=5
Ol'ha Holodna	Shot put	17.15	25	Did not advance	
Natalia Semenova	Discus throw	54.28	31	Did not advance	
Iryna Klymets	Hammer throw	68.29	21	Did not advance	
Iryna Novozhylova	Hammer throw	59.85	30	Did not advance	

== Badminton ==
Ukraine entered two badminton players for each of the following events into the Olympic tournament after received reallocation quota by the BWF.

Athlete	Event	Group Stage			Elimination	Quarterfinal	Semifinal	Final / BM	
Athlete	Event	Opposition Score	Opposition Score	Rank	Opposition Score	Opposition Score	Opposition Score	Opposition Score	Rank
Artem Pochtarov	Men's singles	Lee Z J (MAS); L (5–21, 11–21)	Leverdez (FRA); L (10–21, 8–21)	3	Did not advance				
Marija Ulitina	Women's singles	Zhang (USA); L (12–21, 7–21)	Silva (BRA); W (21–14, 22–20)	2	Did not advance				

== Boxing ==
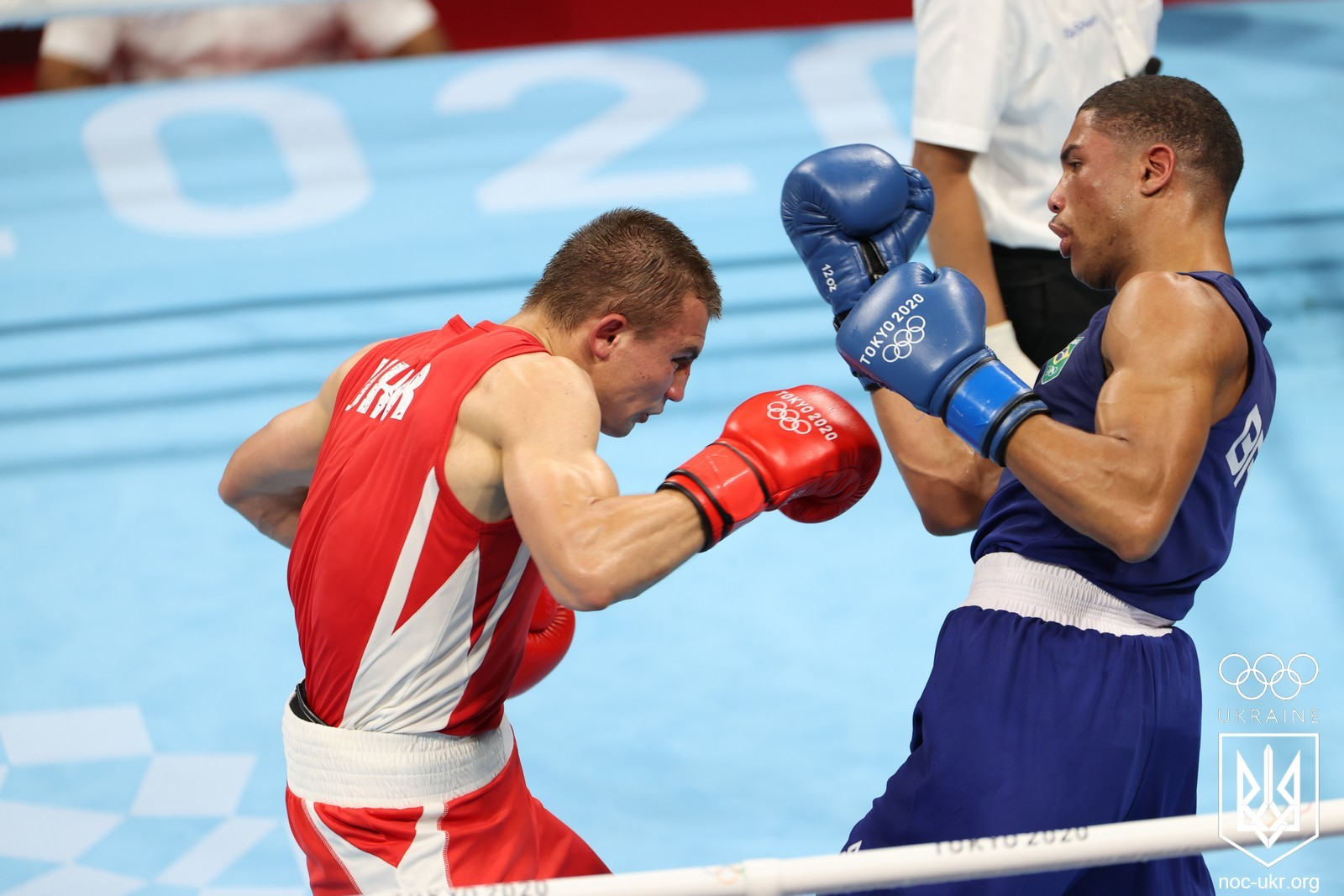
Oleksandr Khyzhniak vs Hebert Conceição in the men's middleweight final on 7 August

Ukraine entered four male boxers and one female boxer into the Olympic tournament. Yaroslav Khartsyz and Rio 2016 Olympian and 2019 European Games silver medalist Mykola Butsenko scored a round-of-16 victory to secure their spots at the 2020 European Qualification Tournament in London, United Kingdom. Oleksandr Khyzhniak and Anna Lysenko secured their quotas at the additional qualification tournament in June 2021 in Villebon-sur-Yvette, France. Tsotne Rogava received a world allocation quota. Yevhenii Barabanov was also expected to compete at the Games after he received a world allocation quota due to his ranking. But he was excluded from the Olympic team due to doping violations.

Athlete	Event	Round of 32	Round of 16	Quarterfinals	Semifinals	Final	
Athlete	Event	Opposition Result	Opposition Result	Opposition Result	Opposition Result	Opposition Result	Rank
Mykola Butsenko	Men's featherweight	Caicedo (ECU); L 2–3	Did not advance				
Yaroslav Khartsyz	Men's lightweight	Chalabiyev (AZE); L 0–5	Did not advance				
Oleksandr Khyzhniak	Men's middleweight	Bye	Moriwaki (JPN); W 5–0	Cedeño (DOM); W 4–1	Marcial (PHI); W 3–2	Conceição (BRA); L KO	2nd place, silver medalist(s)
Tsotne Rogava	Men's super heavyweight	Bye	Clarke (GBR); L 1–4	Did not advance			
Anna Lysenko	Women's welterweight	Bye	Bel Ahbib (MAR); W 5–0	Sürmeneli (TUR); L 0–5	Did not advance		

== Canoeing ==
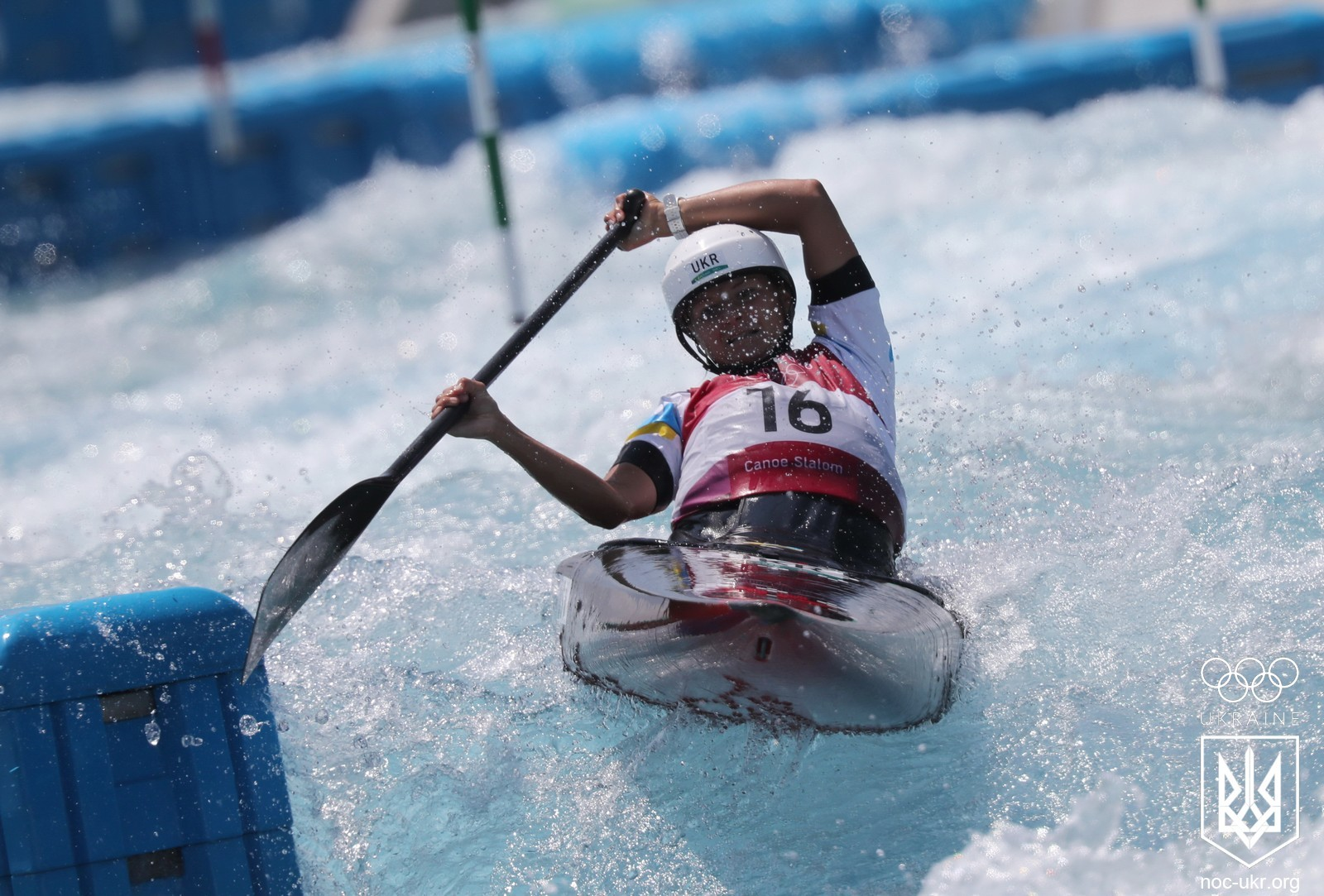
Viktoriia Us in the women's slalom C-1 heats on 28 July

=== Slalom ===
Ukraine qualified one canoeist for the women's K-1 class by finishing in the top eighteen at the 2019 ICF Canoe Slalom World Championships in La Seu d'Urgell, Spain.

Athlete	Event	Preliminary						Semifinal		Final	
Athlete	Event	Run 1	Rank	Run 2	Rank	Best	Rank	Time	Rank	Time	Rank
Viktoriia Us	Women's C-1	123.97	14	119.05	13	119.05	15 Q	122.12	9 Q	122.12	7
Viktoriia Us	Women's K-1	120.09	17	113.99	16	113.99	17 Q	109.53	9 Q	111.85	8

=== Sprint ===
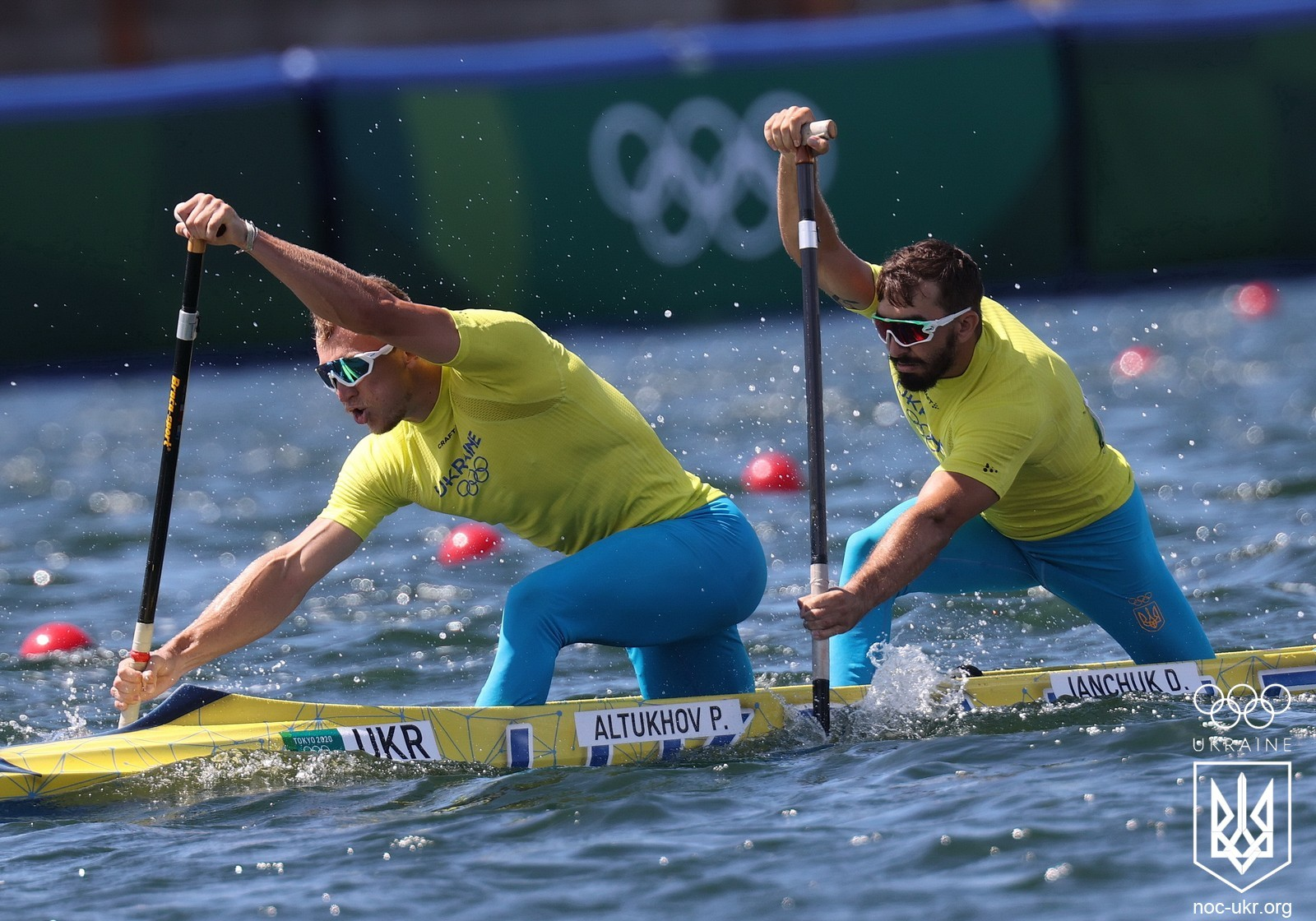
Pavlo Altukhov and Dmytro Ianchuk in the men's C-2 1000 m on 3 August

Ukrainian canoeists qualified five boats in each of the following distances for the Games through the 2019 ICF Canoe Sprint World Championships in Szeged, Hungary. Meanwhile, one additional boat was awarded to the Ukrainian canoeist in the men's C-1 1000 m by winning the gold medal at the 2021 European Canoe Sprint Qualification Regatta.

Men

Athlete	Event	Heat		Quarterfinal		Semifinal		Final	
Athlete	Event	Time	Rank	Time	Rank	Time	Rank	Time	Rank
Pavlo Altukhov	C-1 1000 m	4:15.508	4 QF	4:06.018	2 SF	4:05.857	5 FB	4:04.098	12
Yurii Vandiuk	C-1 1000 m	4:11.346	4 QF	4:08.719	2 SF	4:20.098	8 FB	4:10.910	16
Pavlo Altukhov; Dmytro Ianchuk	C-2 1000 m	4:06.089	6 QF	3:49.356	2 SF	3:28.775	6 FB	3:33.330	13

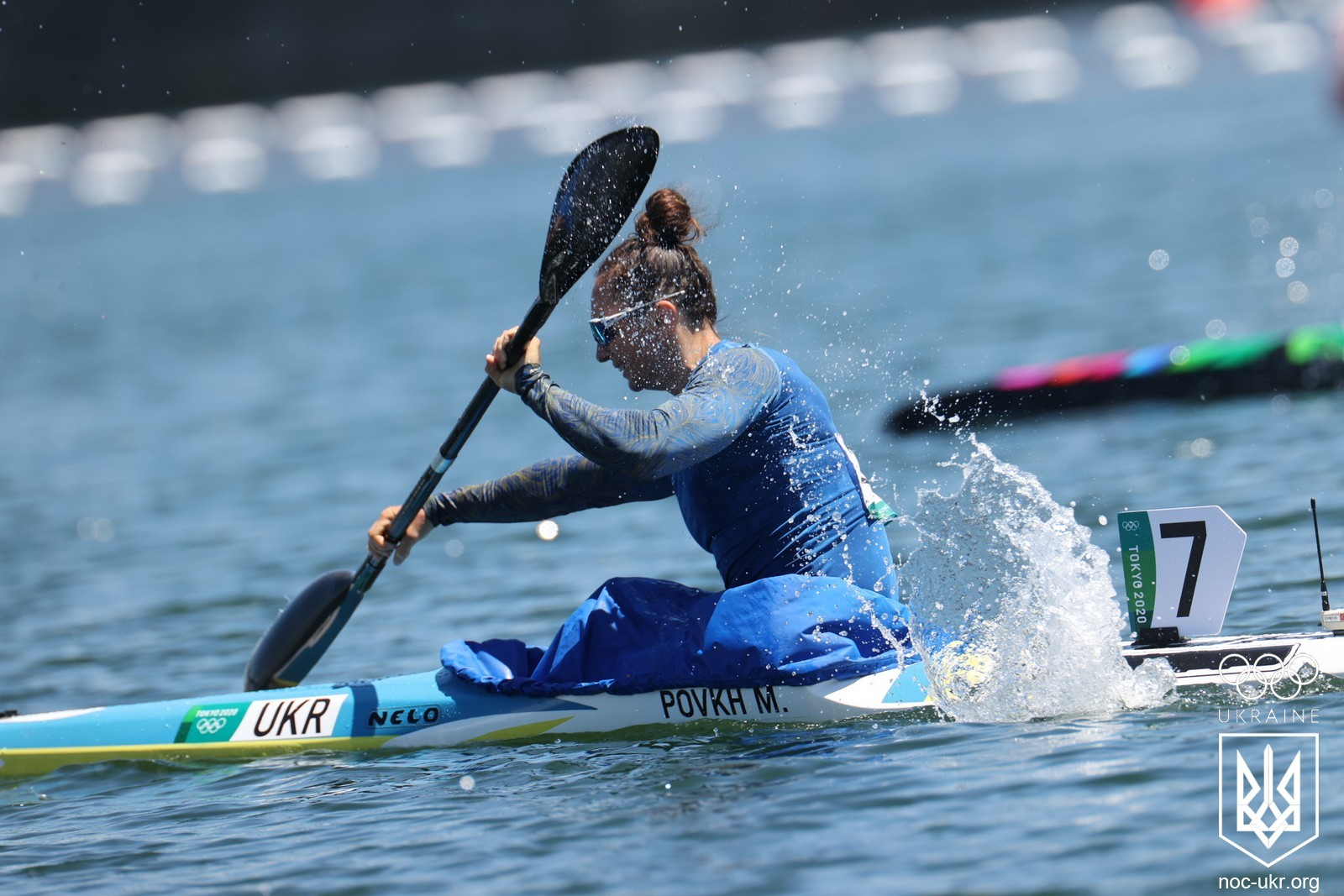
Mariya Povkh in the women's K-1 500 m final on 5 August

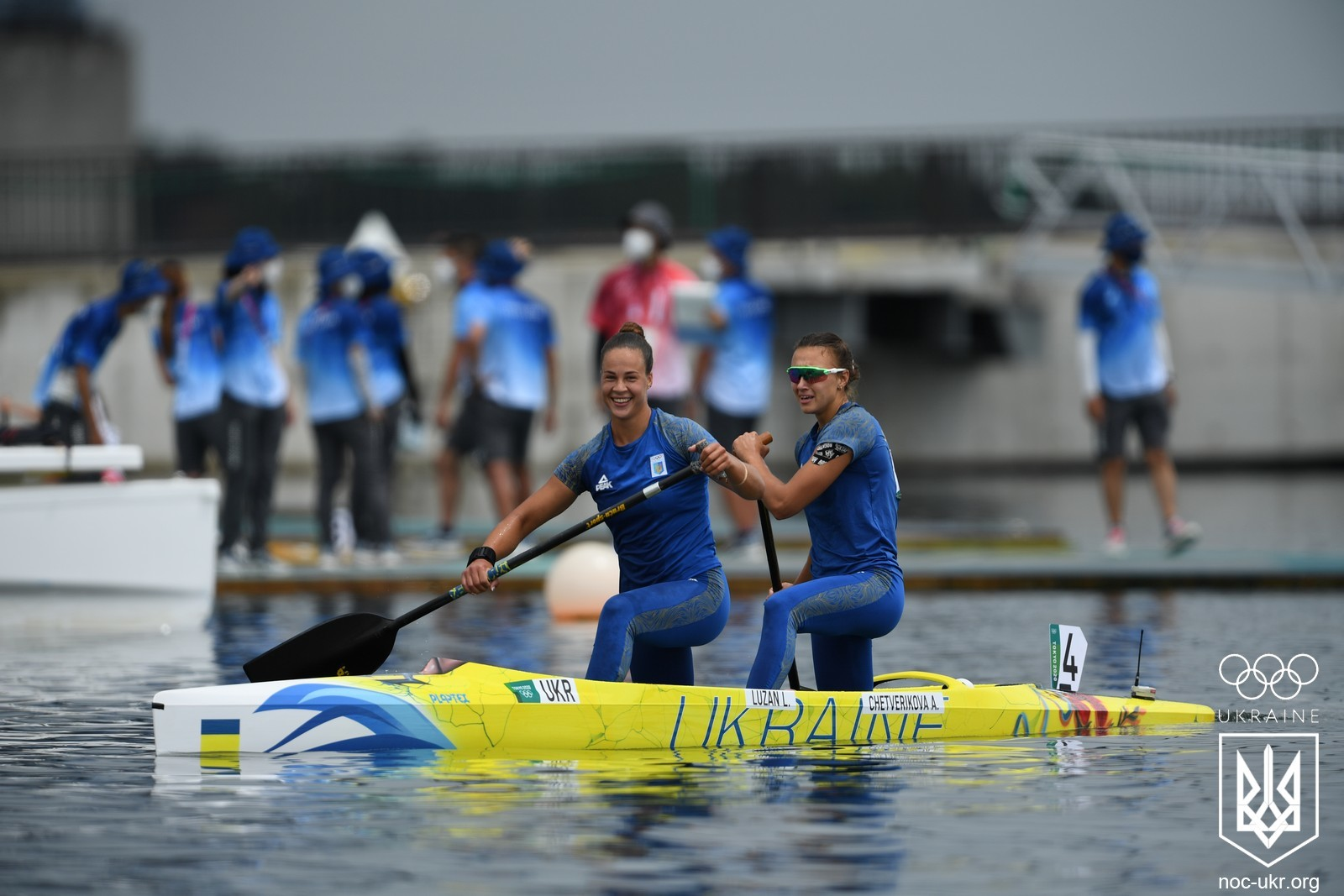
Liudmyla Luzan and Anastasiia Chetverikova in the women's C-2 500 m final on 7 August

Women

Athlete	Event	Heat		Quarterfinal		Semifinal		Final	
Athlete	Event	Time	Rank	Time	Rank	Time	Rank	Time	Rank
Anastasiia Chetverikova	C-1 200 m	47.472	4 QF	46.509	3	Did not advance			
Liudmyla Luzan	C-1 200 m	45.571	1 SF	Bye		47.339	1 FA	47.034	3rd place, bronze medalist(s)
Anastasiia Chetverikova; Liudmyla Luzan	C-2 500 m	2:01.156	1 SF	Bye		2:02.893	1 FA	1:57.499	2nd place, silver medalist(s)
Mariia Kichasova-Skoryk	K-1 200 m	44.564	4 QF	44.247	6	Did not advance			
Yuliia Yuriichuk	K-1 200 m	43.760	5 QF	43.871	5	Did not advance			
Yuliia Yuriichuk	K-1 500 m	1:57.532	5 QF	1:58.657	3 SF	2:03.303	8	Did not advance	
Mariya Povkh	K-1 500 m	1:50.489	4 QF	1:50.769	2 SF	1:53.659	4 FB	1:56.429	15
Liudmyla Kuklinovska; Anastasiia Todorova	K-2 500 m	1:50.733	4 QF	1:53.184	6	Did not advance			
Mariia Kichasova-Skoryk; Liudmyla Kuklinovska; Mariya Povkh; Anastasiia Todorova	K-4 500 m	1:39.224	6 QF	1:36.948	3 SF	1:38.489	5 FB	1:39.276	10

Qualification Legend: FA = Qualify to final (medal); FB = Qualify to final B (non-medal)

== Cycling ==
=== Road ===
Ukraine entered one rider each to compete in the men's and women's Olympic road race, by virtue of his top 50 national finish (for men) and her top 100 individual finish (for women) in the UCI World Ranking.

Athlete	Event	Time	Rank
Anatoliy Budyak	Men's road race	6:16.53	56
Valeriya Kononenko	Women's road race	Did not finish	

=== Track ===
Following the completion of the 2020 UCI Track Cycling World Championships, Ukraine entered at least one rider to compete in the women's sprint and keirin, based on her final individual UCI Olympic rankings.

Sprint

Athlete	Event	Qualification		Round 1	Repechage 1	Round 2	Repechage 2	Round 3	Repechage 3	Quarterfinals	Semifinals	Final	
Athlete	Event	Time Speed (km/h)	Rank	Opposition Time Speed (km/h)	Opposition Time Speed (km/h)	Opposition Time Speed (km/h)	Opposition Time Speed (km/h)	Opposition Time Speed (km/h)	Opposition Time Speed (km/h)	Opposition Time Speed (km/h)	Opposition Time Speed (km/h)	Opposition Time Speed (km/h)	Rank
Lyubov Basova	Women's sprint	10.981; 65.568	23 Q	Mitchell (CAN); L	Bao Sj (CHN); Gaxiola (MEX); L	Did not advance							
Olena Starikova	Women's sprint	10.461; 68.827	6 Q	Verdugo (MEX); W 10.979; 65.580	Bye	Andrews (NZL); W 10.912; 65.982	Bye	Braspennincx (NED); L	Andrews (NZL); Zhong (CHN); W 11.074; 65.017	Friedrich (GER); W 10.977, L, W 10.874	Lee W-s (HKG); W 11.086, W 10.890	Mitchell (CAN); L, L	2nd place, silver medalist(s)

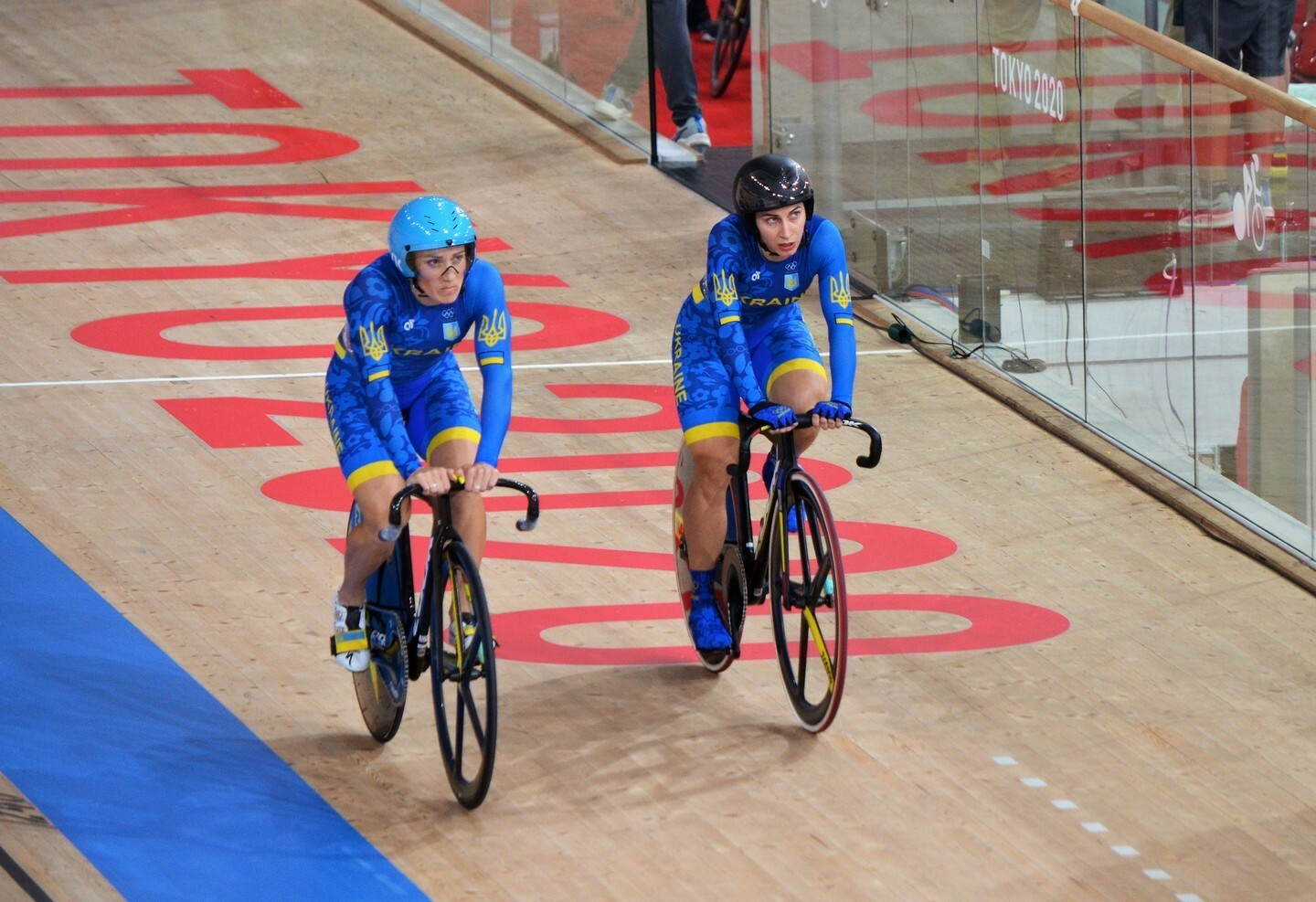
Lyubov Basova and Olena Starikova in the women's sprint

Team sprint

Athlete	Event	Qualification		Semifinals		Final	
Athlete	Event	Time Speed (km/h)	Rank	Opposition Time Speed (km/h)	Rank	Opposition Time Speed (km/h)	Rank
Lyubov Basova; Olena Starikova	Women's team sprint	33.542; 53.664	8	Germany; L 33.285; 54.078	8 FD	Poland; L 33.691; 53.427	8

Qualification legend: FA=Gold medal final; FB=Bronze medal final

Keirin

Athlete	Event	Round 1	Repechage	Quarterfinals	Semifinals	Final
Athlete	Event	Rank	Rank	Rank	Rank	Rank
Lyubov Basova	Women's keirin	6 R	2 Q	4 Q	3 FA	6
Olena Starikova	Women's keirin	1 Q	Bye	2 Q	1 FA	4

=== Mountain biking ===
Ukraine qualified one female mountain bikers, based on the UCI Olympic Mountain Biking rankings.

Athlete	Event	Time	Rank
Yana Belomoyna	Women's cross-country	1:19:40	8

== Diving ==
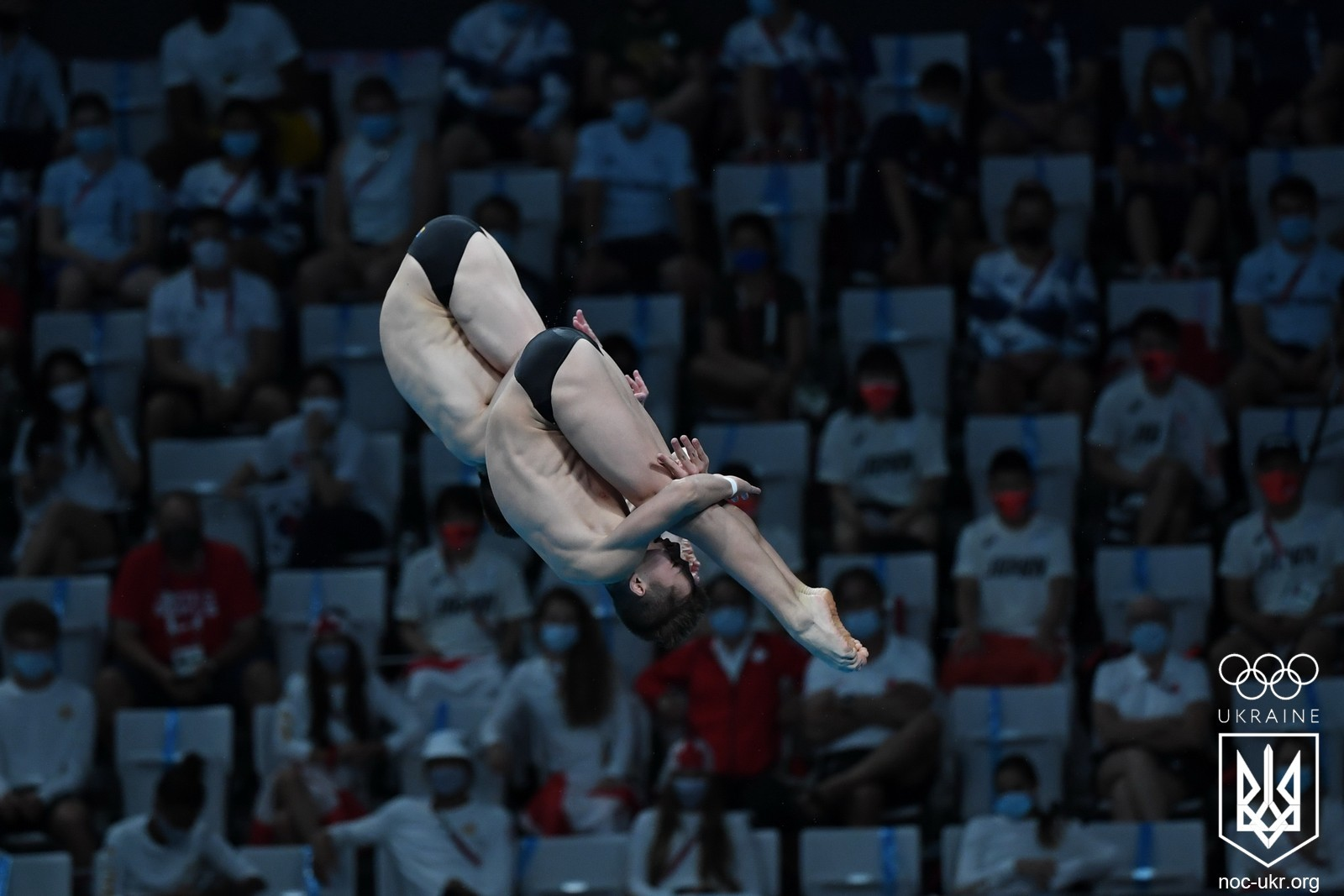
Oleksii Sereda and Oleh Serbin in the men's synchronized 10 m platform

Ukrainian divers qualified for four individual spots and a synchronized team in the men's platform at the Games. Three of them finished in the top twelve of their respective events at the 2019 FINA World Championships, while another diver secured an outright berth in the women's platform at the 2019 European Championships in Kyiv. The men's synchronized platform pair scored the last of the four available berths by finishing seventh in the preliminary round at the 2021 FINA World Cup series in Tokyo, Japan.

Athlete	Event	Preliminary		Semifinal		Final	
Athlete	Event	Points	Rank	Points	Rank	Points	Rank
Oleh Kolodiy	Men's 3 m springboard	351.25	22	Did not advance			
Oleksiy Sereda	Men's 10 m platform	435.90	6 Q	416.05	7 Q	461.70	6
Oleh Serbin; Oleksiy Sereda	Men's 10 m synchronized platform	—N/a				400.44	6
Viktoriya Kezar	Women's 3 m springboard	238.20	23	Did not advance			
Anna Pysmenska	Women's 3 m springboard	232.30	24	Did not advance			
Sofiya Lyskun	Women's 10 m platform	216.55	29	Did not advance			

== Equestrian ==
Ukraine entered two riders into the Olympic equestrian competition by finishing in the top two, outside the group selection, of the individual FEI Olympic Rankings for Group C (Central and Eastern Europe) in both dressage and jumping, respectively.

=== Dressage ===
Athlete	Horse	Event	Grand Prix		Grand Prix Freestyle		Overall	
Athlete	Horse	Event	Score	Rank	Technical	Artistic	Score	Rank
Inna Logutenkova	Fleraro	Individual	66.118	47	Did not advance			

Qualification Legend: Q = Qualified for the final; q = Qualified for the final as a lucky loser

=== Jumping ===
Athlete	Horse	Event	Qualification		Final		
Athlete	Horse	Event	Penalties	Rank	Penalties	Time	Rank
Oleksandr Prodan	Casanova	Individual	13	=57	Did not advance		

== Fencing ==
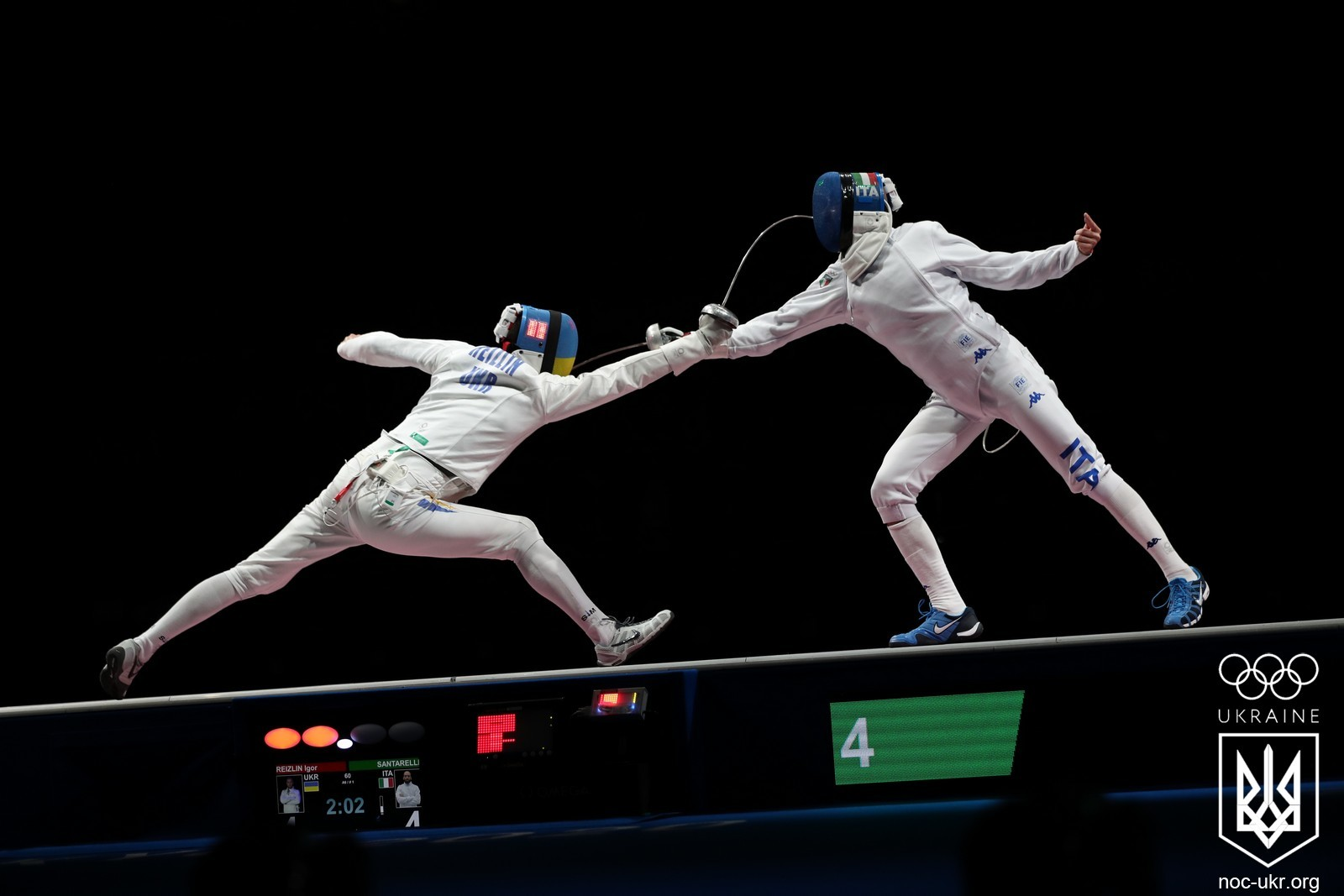
Ihor Reizlin vs Andrea Santarelli in the men's épée bronze medal bout on 25 July

Ukrainian fencers qualified a full squad in the men's team épée at the Games by finishing among the top four nations in the FIE Olympic Team Rankings. Going to her fourth consecutive Games, multiple medalist and four-time world champion Olha Kharlan claimed a spot in the women's sabre as one of the two highest-ranked fencers vying for qualification from Europe in the FIE Adjusted Official Rankings, while two-time Olympian Olena Kryvytska rounded out the Ukrainian roster by winning the final match of the women's épée at the European Zonal Qualifier in Madrid, Spain.

Athlete	Event	Round of 64	Round of 32	Round of 16	Quarterfinal	Semifinal	Final / BM	
Athlete	Event	Opposition Score	Opposition Score	Opposition Score	Opposition Score	Opposition Score	Opposition Score	Rank
Bohdan Nikishyn	Men's épée	Bye	Lan Mh (CHN); L 12–13	Did not advance				
Ihor Reizlin	Men's épée	Bye	Steffen (SUI); W 15–11	Heinzer (SUI); W 15–12	El-Sayed (EGY); W 15–13	Cannone (FRA); L 10–15	Santarelli (ITA); W 15–12	3rd place, bronze medalist(s)
Roman Svichkar	Men's épée	Bye	Heinzer (SUI); L 11–15	Did not advance				
Bohdan Nikishyn; Ihor Reizlin; Roman Svichkar; Anatoliy Herey*	Men's team épée	—N/a		Bye	China; L 35–45	Classification semifinal Italy; W 45–39	5th place final France; L 39–45	6
Olena Kryvytska	Women's épée	Bye	Knapik-Miazga (POL); L 8–15	Did not advance				
Olha Kharlan	Women's sabre	Bye	Yang Hy (CHN); L 12–15	Did not advance				

== Gymnastics ==
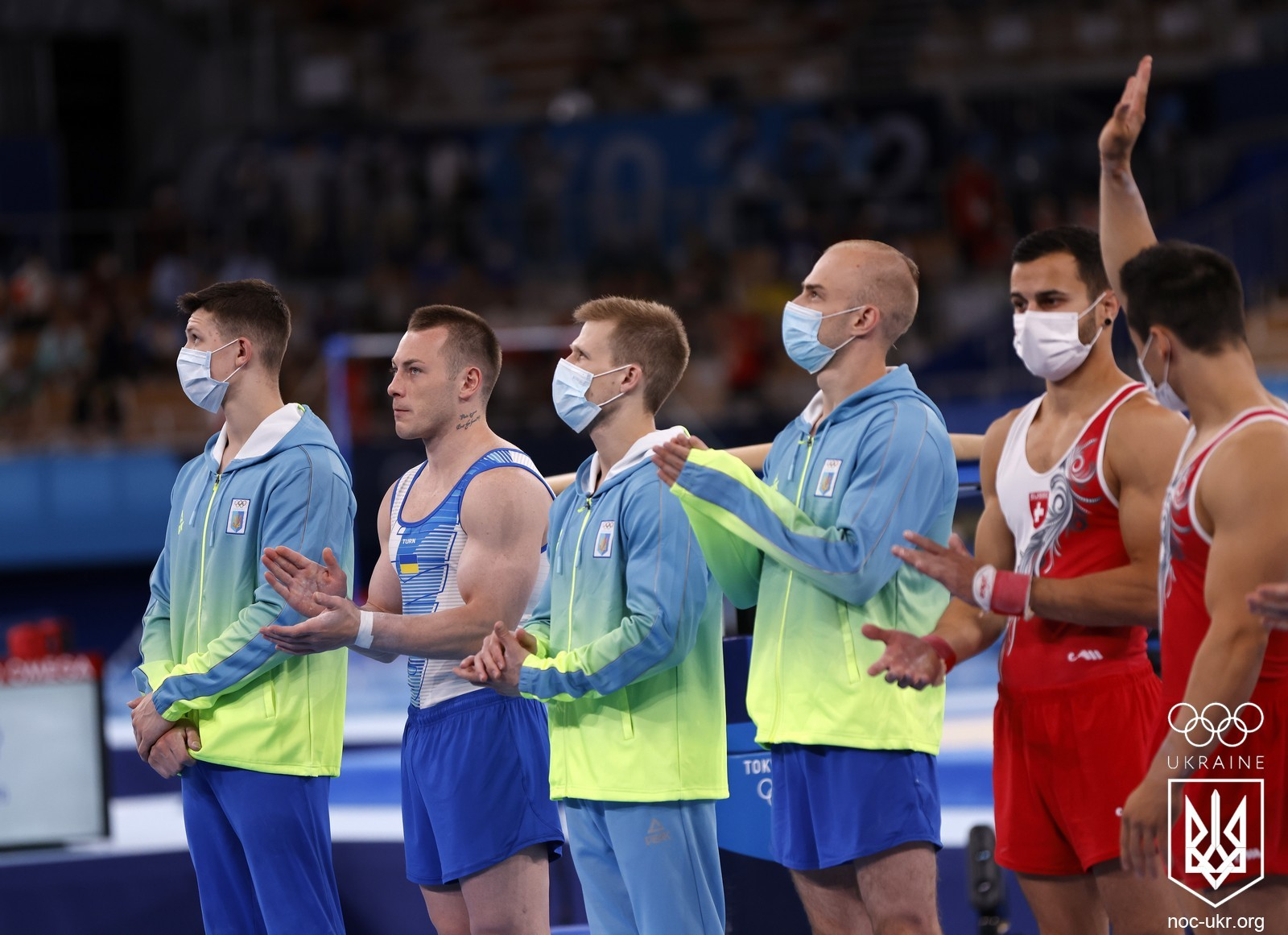
Men's artistic team in the team all-around final on 26 July

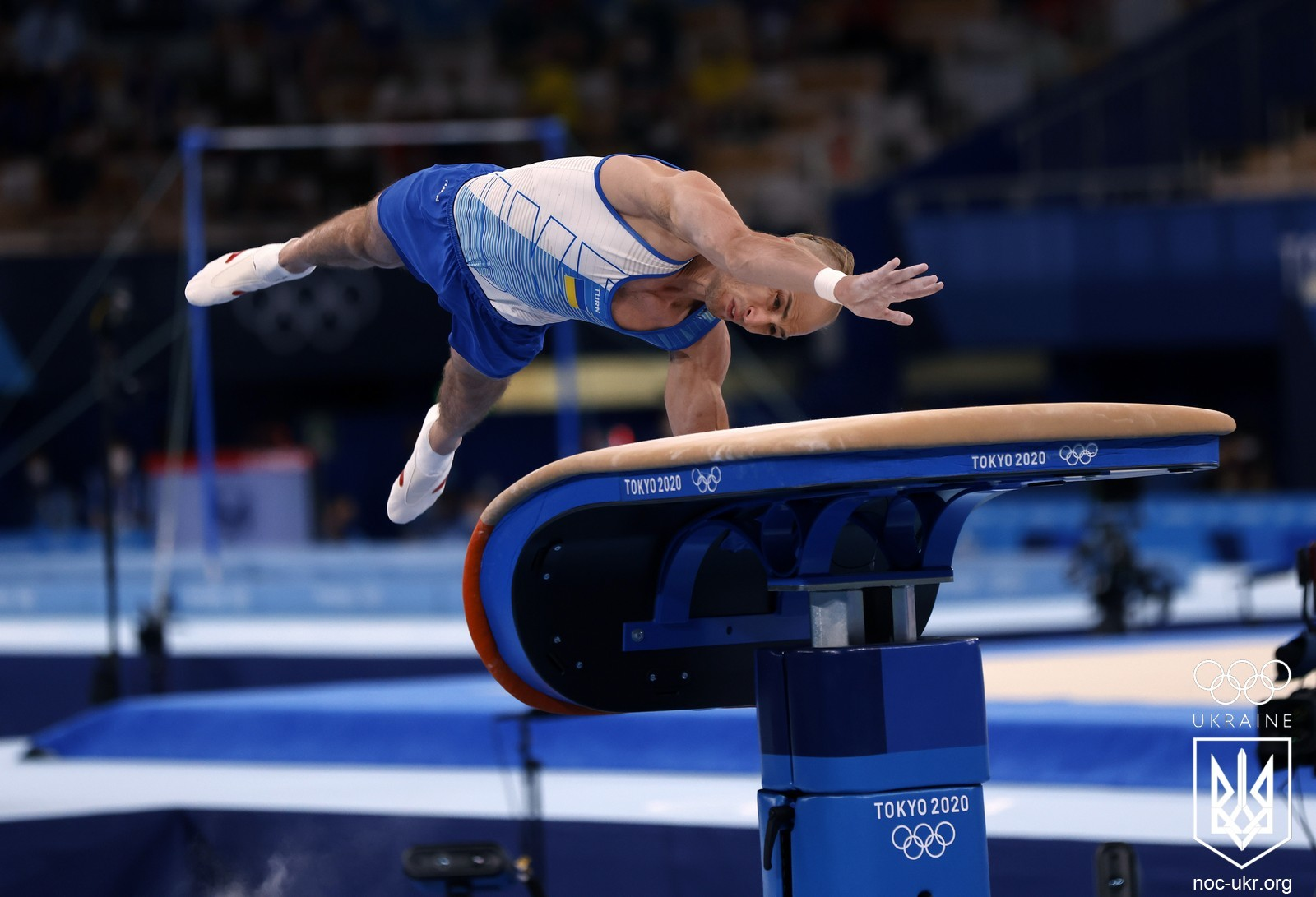
Petro Pakhnyuk performing a vault in the men's artistic team all-around final

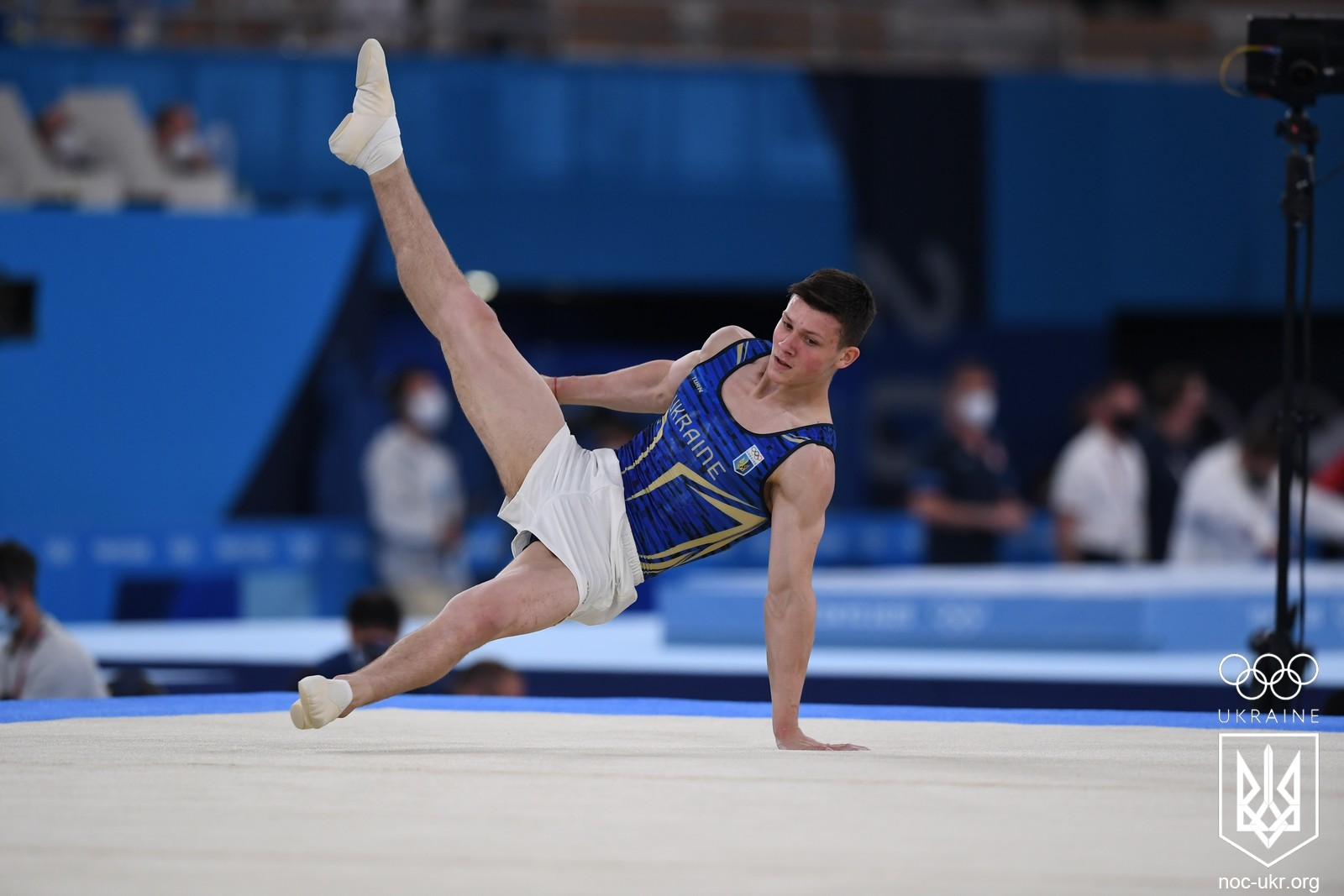
Illia Kovtun performing on floor in the men's artistic individual all-around final on 28 July

=== Artistic ===
Ukraine fielded a full team of five artistic gymnasts (four men and one woman) into the Olympic competition. The men's squad claimed one of the remaining nine spots in the team all-around, while Diana Varinska accepted the berth as a lone Ukrainian female gymnast in the individual all-around and apparatus events at the 2019 World Championships in Stuttgart, Germany.

Men
Team

Athlete	Event	Qualification								Final							
Athlete	Event	Apparatus						Total	Rank	Apparatus						Total	Rank
Athlete	Event	F	PH	R	V	PB	HB	Total	Rank	F	PH	R	V	PB	HB	Total	Rank
Illia Kovtun	Team	12.866	13.666	~~12.833~~	13.816	14.700	13.700	81.581	34 Q	13.800	14.200	—N/a		13.233	14.433	—N/a	
Petro Pakhnyuk	Team	13.566	12.866	13.466	14.100	15.333 Q	13.400	82.731	24 Q	13.466	12.266	12.533	13.233	15.200	13.466	—N/a	
Ihor Radivilov	Team	—N/a		14.466	14.074	—N/a				—N/a		14.633	14.600	—N/a		—N/a	
Yevhen Yudenkov	Team	13.900	12.966	13.266	~~13.500~~	14.266	12.533	80.431	43	13.966	13.533	13.700	13.666	13.800	12.666	—N/a	
Total	Team	40.332	39.498	41.198	42.532	44.299	39.633	247.492	8 Q	41.232	39.999	40.866	41.499	42.233	40.565	246.394	7

Individual

Athlete	Event	Qualification								Final							
Athlete	Event	Apparatus						Total	Rank	Apparatus						Total	Rank
Athlete	Event	F	PH	R	V	PB	HB	Total	Rank	F	PH	R	V	PB	HB	Total	Rank
Illia Kovtun	All-around	See team results								14.133	14.266	13.133	13.833	14.666	13.766	83.797	11
Petro Pakhnyuk	All-around	See team results								13.900	13.633	13.200	14.233	13.266	13.033	81.265	19
Petro Pakhnyuk	Parallel bars	—N/a				15.333	—N/a	15.333	8 Q	—N/a				14.533	—N/a	14.533	7

Women

Athlete	Event	Qualification						Final					
Athlete	Event	Apparatus				Total	Rank	Apparatus				Total	Rank
Athlete	Event	V	UB	BB	F	Total	Rank	V	UB	BB	F	Total	Rank
Diana Varinska	All-around	12.633	11.633	12.566	12.733	49.565	62	Did not advance					

=== Rhythmic ===
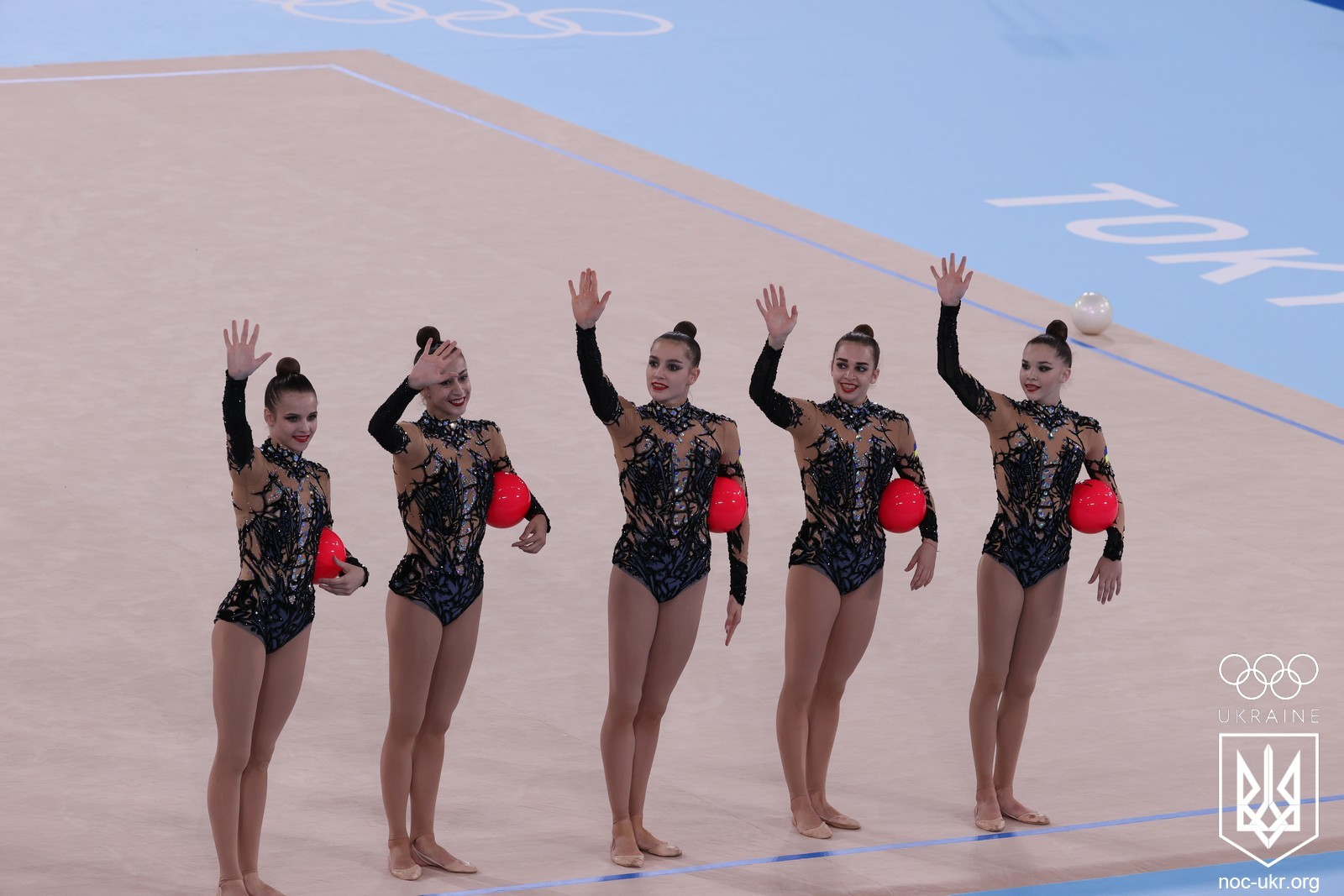
Rhythmic gymnastics team in the group all-around final on 8 August

Ukraine qualified a squad of rhythmic gymnasts for the individual and group all-around by finishing in the top 16 (for individual) and top 5 (for group), respectively, at the 2019 World Championships in Baku, Azerbaijan.

Athlete	Event	Qualification						Final					
Athlete	Event	Hoop	Ball	Clubs	Ribbon	Total	Rank	Hoop	Ball	Clubs	Ribbon	Total	Rank
Viktoriia Onopriienko	Individual	23.800	24.300	26.100	21.250	95.450	9 Q	24.000	23.550	26.100	19.700	93.350	10
Khrystyna Pohranychna	Individual	24.600	23.800	25.700	19.000	93.100	10 Q	24.500	24.100	24.900	21.600	95.100	9

Athletes	Event	Qualification				Final			
Athletes	Event	5 apps	3+2 apps	Total	Rank	5 apps.	3+2 apps	Total	Rank
Mariola Bodnarchuk; Daryna Duda; Yeva Meleshchuk; Anastasiya Voznyak; Mariia Vysochanska	Group	41.450	41.250	82.700	6 Q	40.350	37.250	77.600	7

== Judo ==
Ukraine entered seven judoka (four men and three women) into the Olympic tournament based on the International Judo Federation Olympics Individual Ranking.

Men

Athlete	Event	Round of 64	Round of 32	Round of 16	Quarterfinals	Repechage	Semifinals	Final / BM	
Athlete	Event	Opposition Result	Opposition Result	Opposition Result	Opposition Result	Opposition Result	Opposition Result	Opposition Result	Rank
Artem Lesiuk	−60 kg	—N/a	Ramos (GUA); W 10–00	Lutfillaev (UZB); W 01–00	Mkheidze (FRA); L 00–10	—N/a	Tsjakadoea (NED); L 00–10	Did not advance	7
Georgii Zantaraia	−66 kg	—N/a	Gaitero Martin (ESP); W 10–00	Gomboc (SLO); L 00–01	Did not advance				
Quedjau Nhabali	−90 kg	Bye	Florentino (DOM); W 01–00	Bobonov (UZB); L 00–10	Did not advance				
Yakiv Khammo	+100 kg	—N/a	Bye	Simionescu (ROU); W 01–00	Harasawa (JPN); L 00–10	Oltiboev (UZB); W 01–00	—N/a	Bashaev (ROC); L 00–10	5

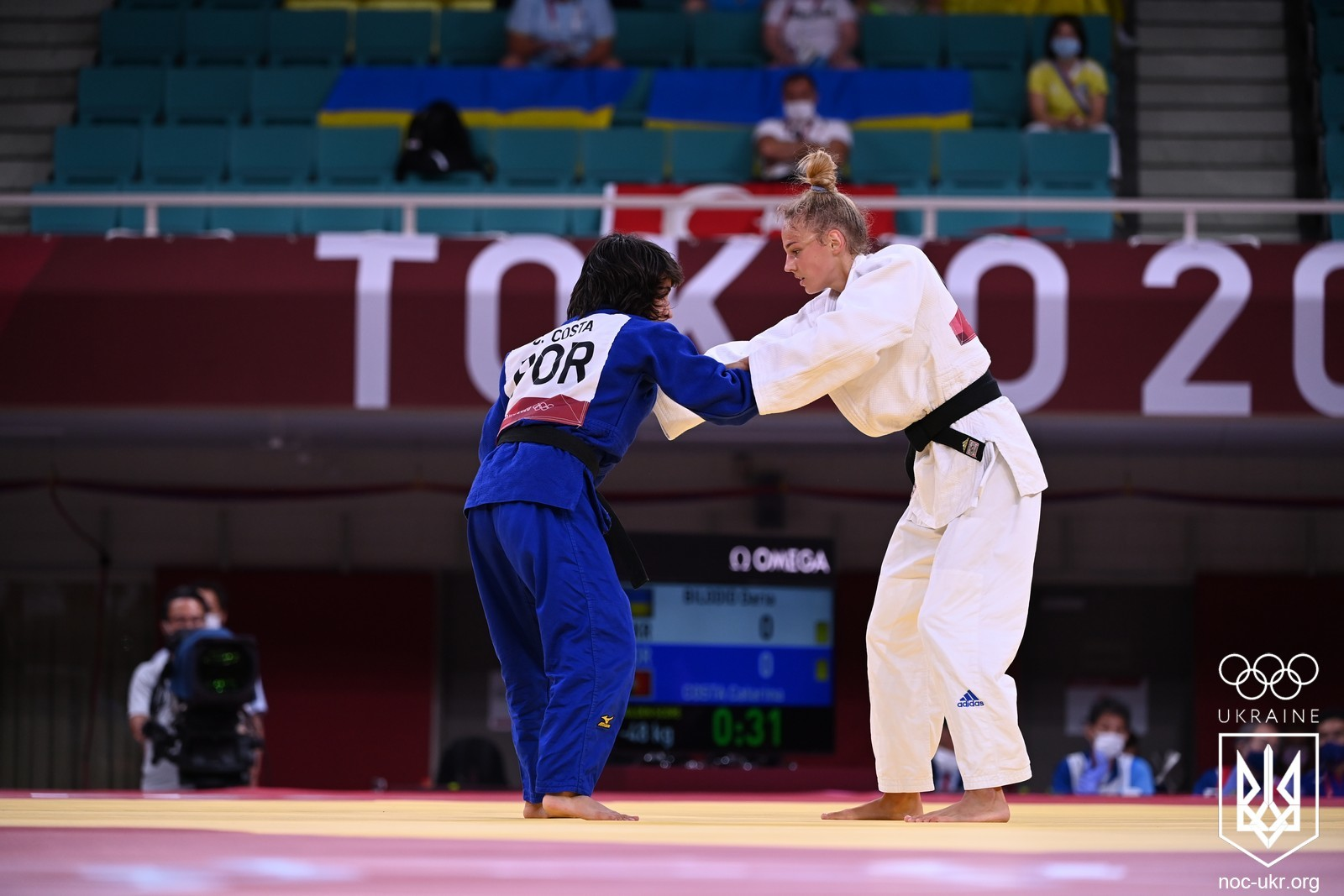
Catarina Costa vs Daria Bilodid in the women's 48 kg on 24 July

Women

Athlete	Event	Round of 32	Round of 16	Quarterfinals	Semifinals	Repechage	Final / BM	
Athlete	Event	Opposition Result	Opposition Result	Opposition Result	Opposition Result	Opposition Result	Opposition Result	Rank
Daria Bilodid	−48 kg	Bye	Nikolić (SRB); W 01–00	Costa (POR); W 10–00	Tonaki (JPN); L 00–01	Bye	Rishony (ISR); W 10–00	3rd place, bronze medalist(s)
Anastasiya Turchyn	−78 kg	Chalá (ECU); W 10–00	Steenhuis (NED); L 00–01	Did not advance				
Yelyzaveta Kalanina	+78 kg	Asselah (ALG); W 10–00	Sayit (TUR); L 00–10	Did not advance				

== Karate ==
Ukraine entered three karateka into the inaugural Olympic tournament. 2019 European Games champion Stanislav Horuna (men's 75 kg) and silver medalist Anzhelika Terliuga (women's 55 kg) qualified directly for their respective kumite categories by finishing among the top four karateka at the end of the combined WKF Olympic Rankings.

Athlete	Event	Group stage					Semifinals	Final	
Athlete	Event	Opposition Result	Opposition Result	Opposition Result	Opposition Result	Rank	Opposition Result	Opposition Result	Rank
Stanislav Horuna	Men's −75 kg	Nishimura (JPN); W 2–1	Scott (USA); W 2–1	Hárspataki (HUN); D 0–0	Abdelaziz (EGY); L 1–4	2 Q	Busà (ITA); L 0–3	Did not advance	3rd place, bronze medalist(s)
Anzhelika Terliuga	Women's −55 kg	Sayed (EGY); W 1–0	Zhangbyrbay (KAZ); D 4–4	Plank (AUT); D 0–0	Miyahara (JPN); W 4–0	1 Q	Wen T-y (TPE); W 4–4	Goranova (BUL); L 1–5	2nd place, silver medalist(s)
Anita Serogina	Women's −61 kg	Grande (PER); W 6–1	Sadini (MAR); D 1–1	Farouk (EGY); L 1–2	Preković (SRB); L 4–6	3	Did not advance		

== Modern pentathlon ==
Ukrainian athletes qualified for the following spots to compete in modern pentathlon. Pavlo Tymoshchenko booked second of eight available spots at world ranking.

Athlete	Event	Fencing (épée one touch)				Swimming (200 m freestyle)			Riding (show jumping)			Combined: shooting/running (10 m air pistol)/(3200 m)			Total points	Final rank
Athlete	Event	RR	BR	Rank	MP points	Time	Rank	MP points	Penalties	Rank	MP points	Time	Rank	MP points	Total points	Final rank
Pavlo Tymoshchenko	Men's	22–13	1	8	233	2:06.84	30	297	7	7	293	11:36.58	25	604	1427	15

== Rowing ==
Ukraine qualified one boat in the men's lightweight double sculls for the Games by winning the gold medal and securing the first of two berths available at the 2021 FISA European Olympic Qualification Regatta in Varese, Italy.

Athlete	Event	Heats		Repechage		Semifinals		Final	
Athlete	Event	Time	Rank	Time	Rank	Time	Rank	Time	Rank
Ihor Khmara; Stanislav Kovalov	Men's lightweight double sculls	6:36.05	4 R	6:36.28	1 SA/B	6:14.57	4 FB	6:16.92	9

Qualification Legend: FA=Final A (medal); FB=Final B (non-medal); FC=Final C (non-medal); FD=Final D (non-medal); FE=Final E (non-medal); FF=Final F (non-medal); SA/B=Semifinals A/B; SC/D=Semifinals C/D; SE/F=Semifinals E/F; QF=Quarterfinals; R=Repechage

== Shooting ==
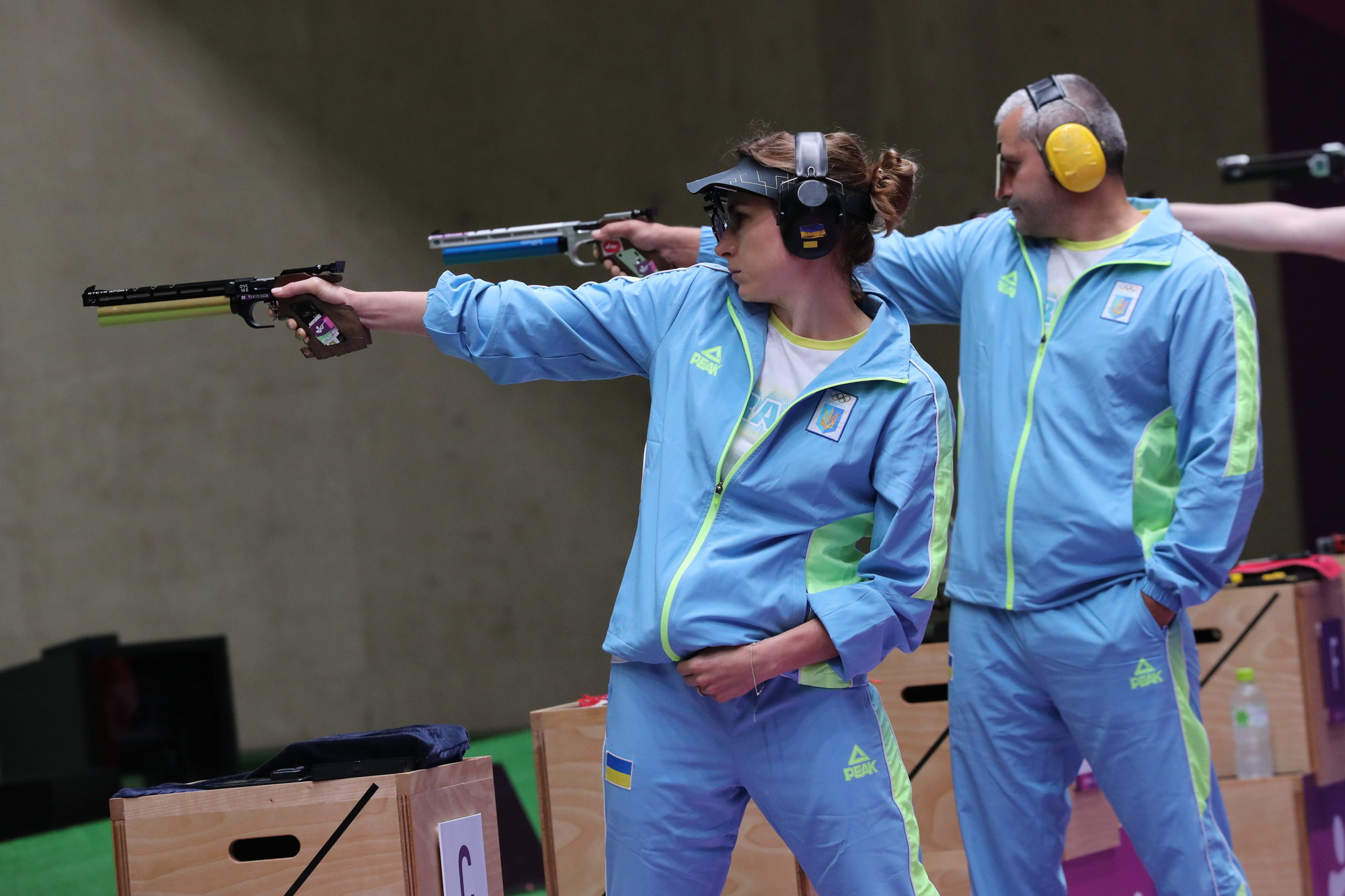
Olena Kostevych and Oleh Omelchuk competing against Serbia in the mixed 10 m air pistol team on 27 July

Ukrainian shooters achieved quota places for the following events by virtue of their best finishes at the 2018 ISSF World Championships, the 2019 ISSF World Cup series, European Championships or Games, and European Qualifying Tournament, as long as they obtained a minimum qualifying score (MQS) by May 31, 2020.

Athlete	Event	Qualification		Semifinal		Final	
Athlete	Event	Points	Rank	Points	Rank	Points	Rank
Pavlo Korostylov	Men's 10 m air pistol	581	4 Q	—N/a		189.9	4
Pavlo Korostylov	Men's 25 m rapid fire pistol	580	9	—N/a		Did not advance	
Serhiy Kulish	Men's 10 m air rifle	623.5	29	—N/a		Did not advance	
Serhiy Kulish	Men's 50 m rifle 3 positions	1178	6 Q	—N/a		402.2	8
Oleh Omelchuk	Men's 10 m air pistol	575	18	—N/a		Did not advance	
Oleh Tsarkov	Men's 10 m air rifle	621.0	40	—N/a		Did not advance	
Oleh Tsarkov	Men's 50 m rifle 3 positions	1166	22	—N/a		Did not advance	
Olena Kostevych	Women's 10 m air pistol	577	7 Q	—N/a		197.6	4
Olena Kostevych	Women's 25 m pistol	579	23	—N/a		Did not advance	
Iryna Malovichko	Women's skeet	119	8	—N/a		Did not advance	
Oleh Omelchuk; Olena Kostevych	Mixed 10 m air pistol team	580	4 Q	386	3 q	Arunović / Mikec (SRB); W 16–12	3rd place, bronze medalist(s)

== Swimming ==
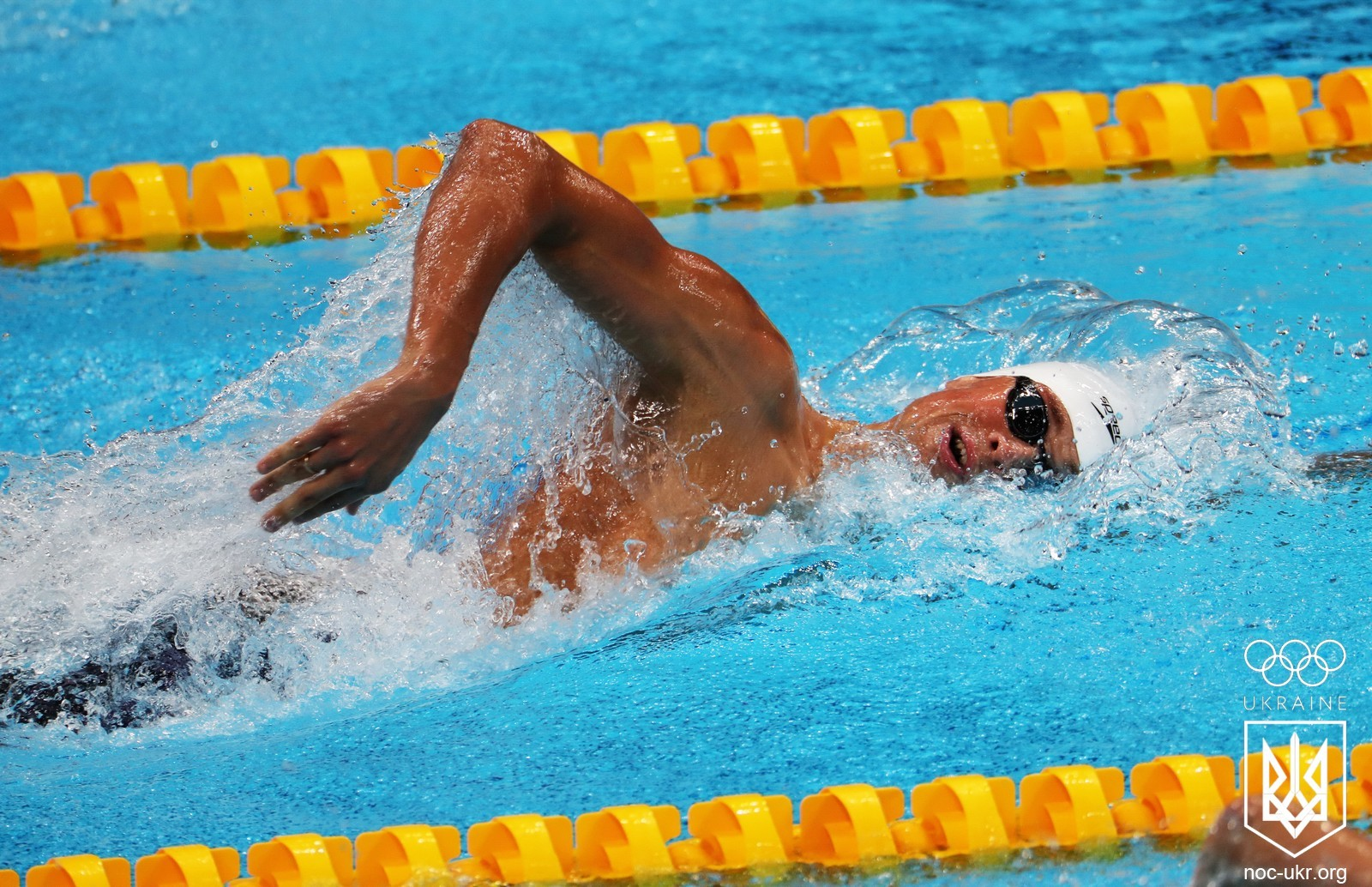
Mykhailo Romanchuk competing in the men's 800 m freestyle final

Ukrainian swimmers further achieved qualifying standards in the following events (up to a maximum of 2 swimmers in each event at the Olympic Qualifying Time (OQT), and potentially 1 at the Olympic Selection Time (OST)):

Men

Athlete	Event	Heat		Semifinal		Final	
Athlete	Event	Time	Rank	Time	Rank	Time	Rank
Vladyslav Bukhov	50 m freestyle	21.73	5 Q	21.83	11	Did not advance	
Serhiy Frolov	800 m freestyle	7:47.67	7 Q	—N/a		7:45.11	6
Serhiy Frolov	1500 m freestyle	14:51.83	6 Q	—N/a		15:04.26	8
Denys Kesil	200 m butterfly	1:56.37	21	Did not advance			
Mykhailo Romanchuk	800 m freestyle	7:41.28	1 Q	—N/a		7:42.33	3rd place, bronze medalist(s)
Mykhailo Romanchuk	1500 m freestyle	14:45.99	1 Q	—N/a		14:40.66	2nd place, silver medalist(s)
Serhiy Shevtsov	100 m freestyle	49.55	35	Did not advance			
Ihor Troianovskyi	100 m butterfly	DNS		Did not advance			
Ihor Troianovskyi	200 m butterfly	1:58.37	29	Did not advance			

Women

Athlete	Event	Heat		Semifinal		Final	
Athlete	Event	Time	Rank	Time	Rank	Time	Rank
Krystyna Panchishko	10 km open water	—N/a				2:07:35.1	22
Daryna Zevina	100 m backstroke	1:01.97	30	Did not advance			
Daryna Zevina	200 m backstroke	2:12.30	19	Did not advance			

== Table tennis ==
Ukraine entered three athlete into the table tennis competition at the Games. Two-time Olympian Kou Lei (2008 and 2016) booked his third trip to the Games by winning the second-stage final match of the men's singles at the European Qualification Tournament in Odivelas, Portugal.

Athlete	Event	Preliminary	Round 1	Round 2	Round 3	Round of 16	Quarterfinals	Semifinals	Final / BM	
Athlete	Event	Opposition Result	Opposition Result	Opposition Result	Opposition Result	Opposition Result	Opposition Result	Opposition Result	Opposition Result	Rank
Kou Lei	Men's singles	Bye	Hmam (TUN); W 4–0	Assar (EGY); L 3–4	Did not advance					
Hanna Haponova	Women's singles	Bye	Liu (AUT); L 2–4	Did not advance						
Margaryta Pesotska	Women's singles	Bye		Batra (IND); L 3–4	Did not advance					

== Tennis ==
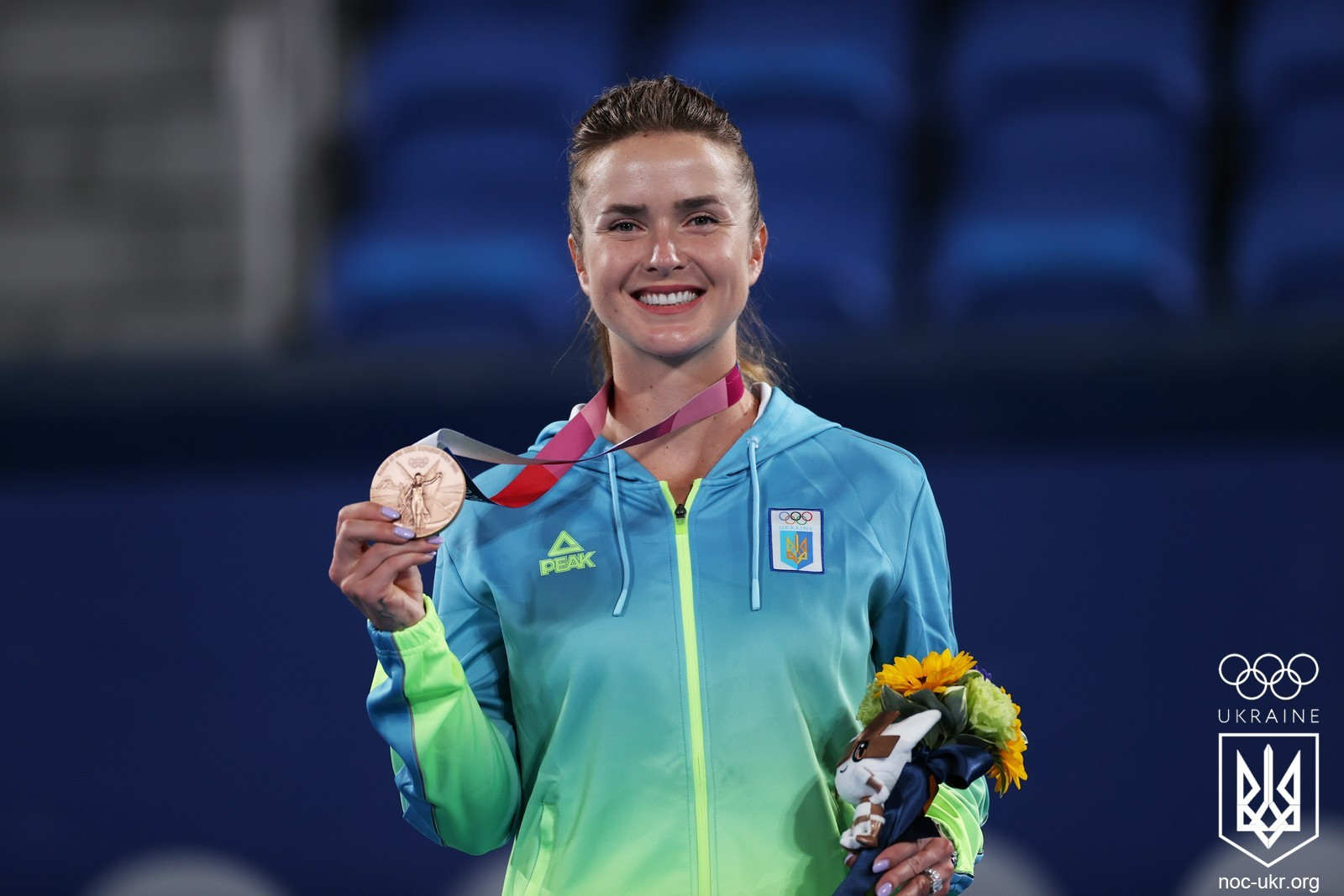
Elina Svitolina with her bronze Olympic medal

Athlete	Event	Round of 64	Round of 32	Round of 16	Quarterfinals	Semifinals	Final / BM	
Athlete	Event	Opposition Score	Opposition Score	Opposition Score	Opposition Score	Opposition Score	Opposition Score	Rank
Elina Svitolina	Women's singles	Siegemund (GER); W 6–3, 5–7, 6–4	Tomljanović (AUS); W 4–6, 6–3, 6–4	Sakkari (GRE); W 5–7, 6–3, 6–4	Giorgi (ITA); W 6–4, 6–4	Vondroušová (CZE); L 3–6, 1–6	Rybakina (KAZ); W 1–6, 7–6^{(7–5)}, 6–4	3rd place, bronze medalist(s)
Dayana Yastremska	Women's singles	Fernandez (CAN); L 3–6, 6–3, 0–6	Did not advance					
Lyudmyla Kichenok; Nadiia Kichenok	Women's doubles	—N/a	Mirza / Raina (IND); W 0–6, 7–6^{(7–0)}, [10–8]	Errani / Paolini (ITA); W 7–6^{(7–4)}, 6–2	Kudermetova / Vesnina (ROC); L 2–6, 1–6	Did not advance		
Elina Svitolina; Dayana Yastremska	Women's doubles	—N/a	Cornet / Ferro (FRA); L 2–6, 4–6	Did not advance				

== Triathlon ==
Ukraine sent one triathlete to compete at the Games. She was disqualified prior to the start of the race due to a positive doping test.

Individual

Athlete	Event	Time						Rank
Athlete	Event	Swim (1.5 km)	Trans 1	Bike (40 km)	Trans 2	Run (10 km)	Total	Rank
Yuliya Yelistratova	Women's	Did not start						

== Weightlifting ==
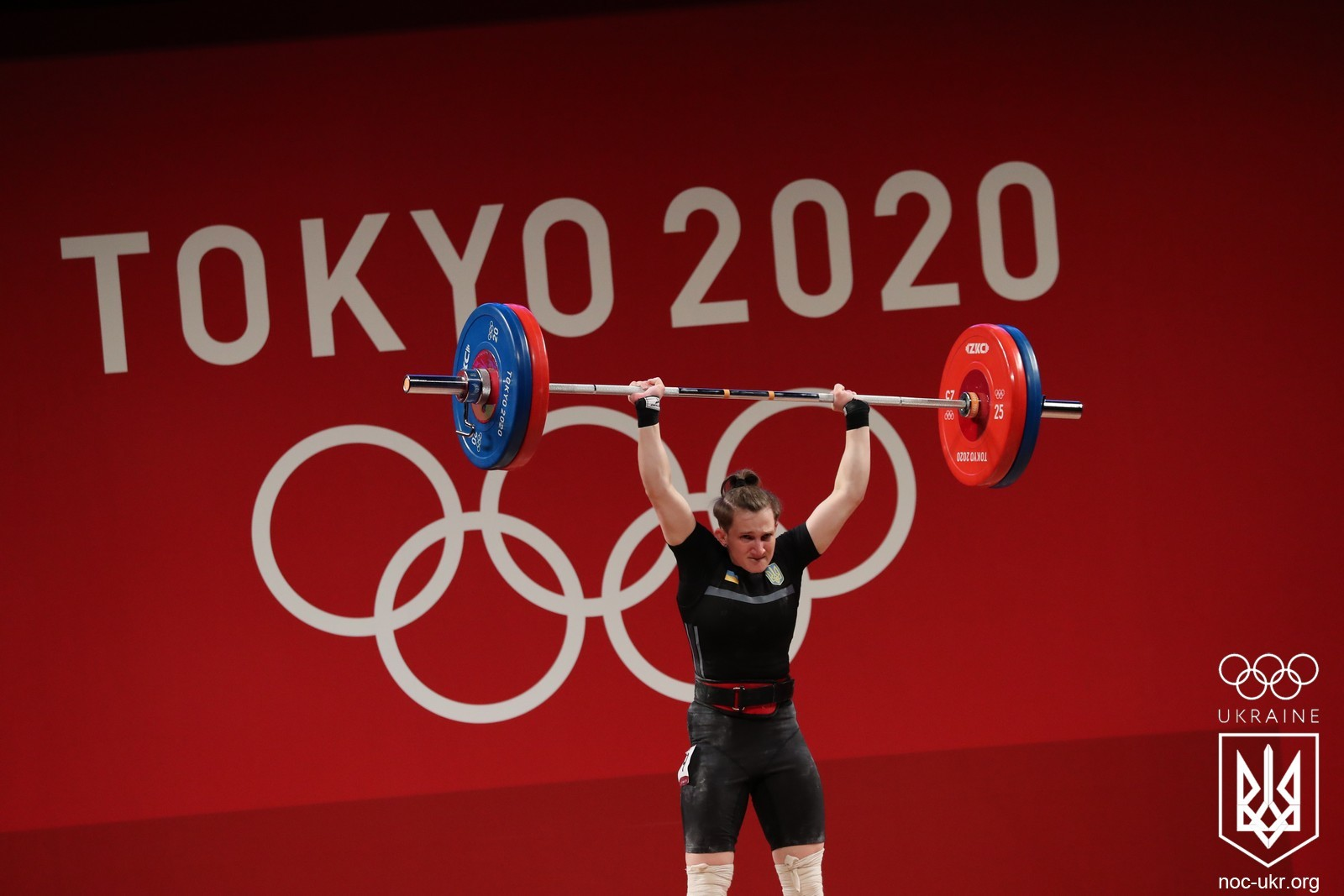
Kamila Konotop in the women's 55 kg on 26 July

Ukrainian weightlifters qualified for two quota places at the games, based on the Tokyo 2020 Rankings Qualification List of 11 June 2021.

Athlete	Event	Snatch		Clean & Jerk		Total	Rank
Athlete	Event	Result	Rank	Result	Rank	Total	Rank
Kamila Konotop	Women's –55 kg	94	4	112	7	206	5
Iryna Dekha	Women's –76 kg	113	2	~~131~~	DNF	113	DNF

== Wrestling ==
Ukraine qualified ten wrestlers for each of the following classes into the Olympic competition. Five of them finished among the top six to book Olympic spots in the men's freestyle 125 kg, men's Greco-Roman (60 and 87 kg) and women's freestyle (50 and 68 kg) at the 2019 World Championships, while two additional licenses were awarded to the Ukrainian wrestlers, who progressed to the top two finals of the women's freestyle 57 and 62 kg, respectively, at the 2021 European Qualification Tournament in Budapest, Hungary. Three Ukrainian wrestlers claimed one of the remaining slots each in the men's freestyle 74 kg, women's freestyle 76 kg, and men's Greco-Roman 67 kg, respectively, to complete the nation's roster at the 2021 World Qualification Tournament in Sofia, Bulgaria.

Key:

- VT (ranking points: 5–0 or 0–5) – Victory by fall.
- VB (ranking points: 5–0 or 0–5) – Victory by injury (VF for forfeit, VA for withdrawal or disqualification)
- PP (ranking points: 3–1 or 1–3) – Decision by points – the loser with technical points.
- PO (ranking points: 3–0 or 0–3) – Decision by points – the loser without technical points.
- ST (ranking points: 4–0 or 0–4) – Great superiority – the loser without technical points and a margin of victory of at least 8 (Greco-Roman) or 10 (freestyle) points.
- SP (ranking points: 4–1 or 1–4) – Technical superiority – the loser with technical points and a margin of victory of at least 8 (Greco-Roman) or 10 (freestyle) points.

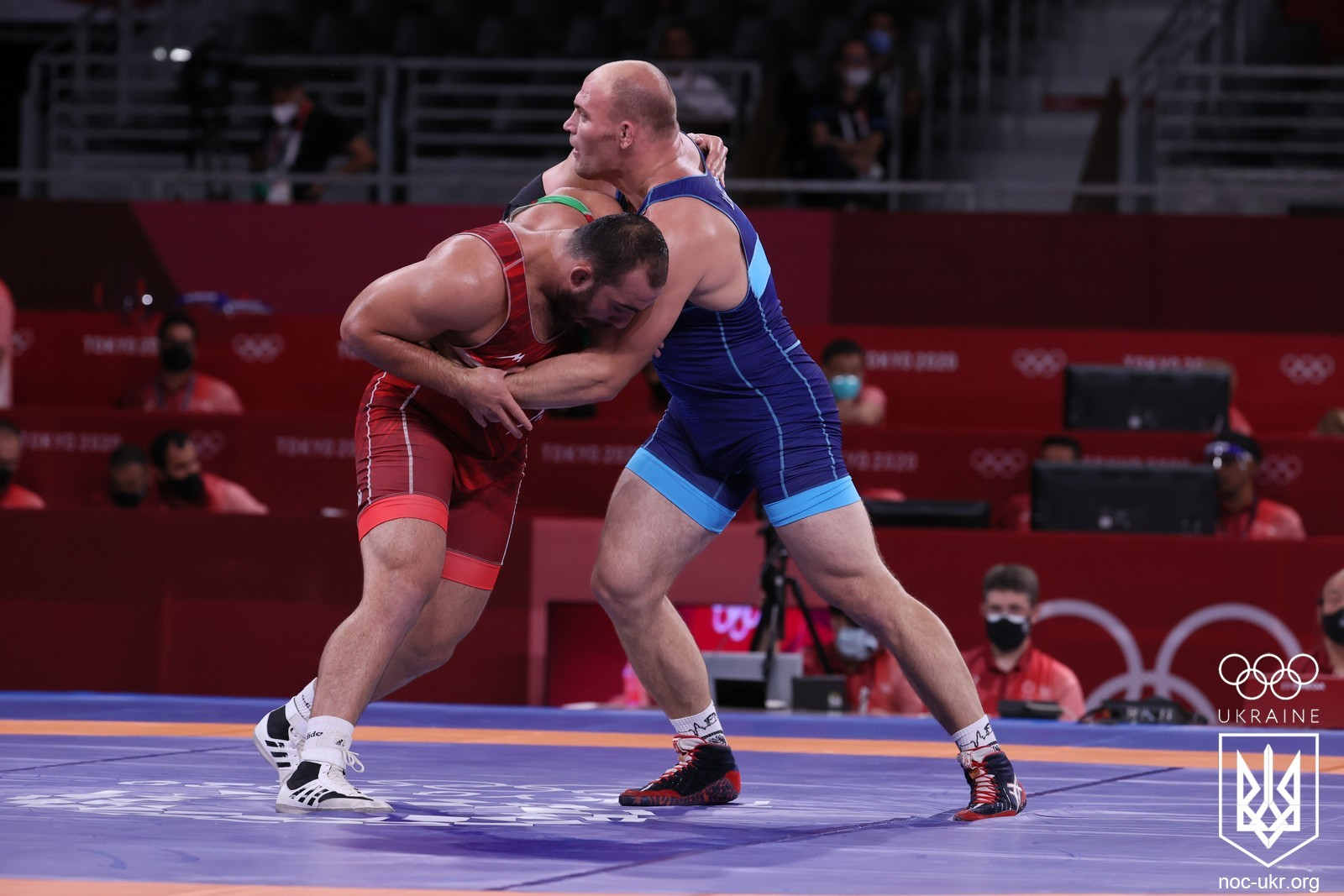
Amir Hossein Zare vs Oleksandr Khotsianivskyi in the men's freestyle 125 kg qualification round

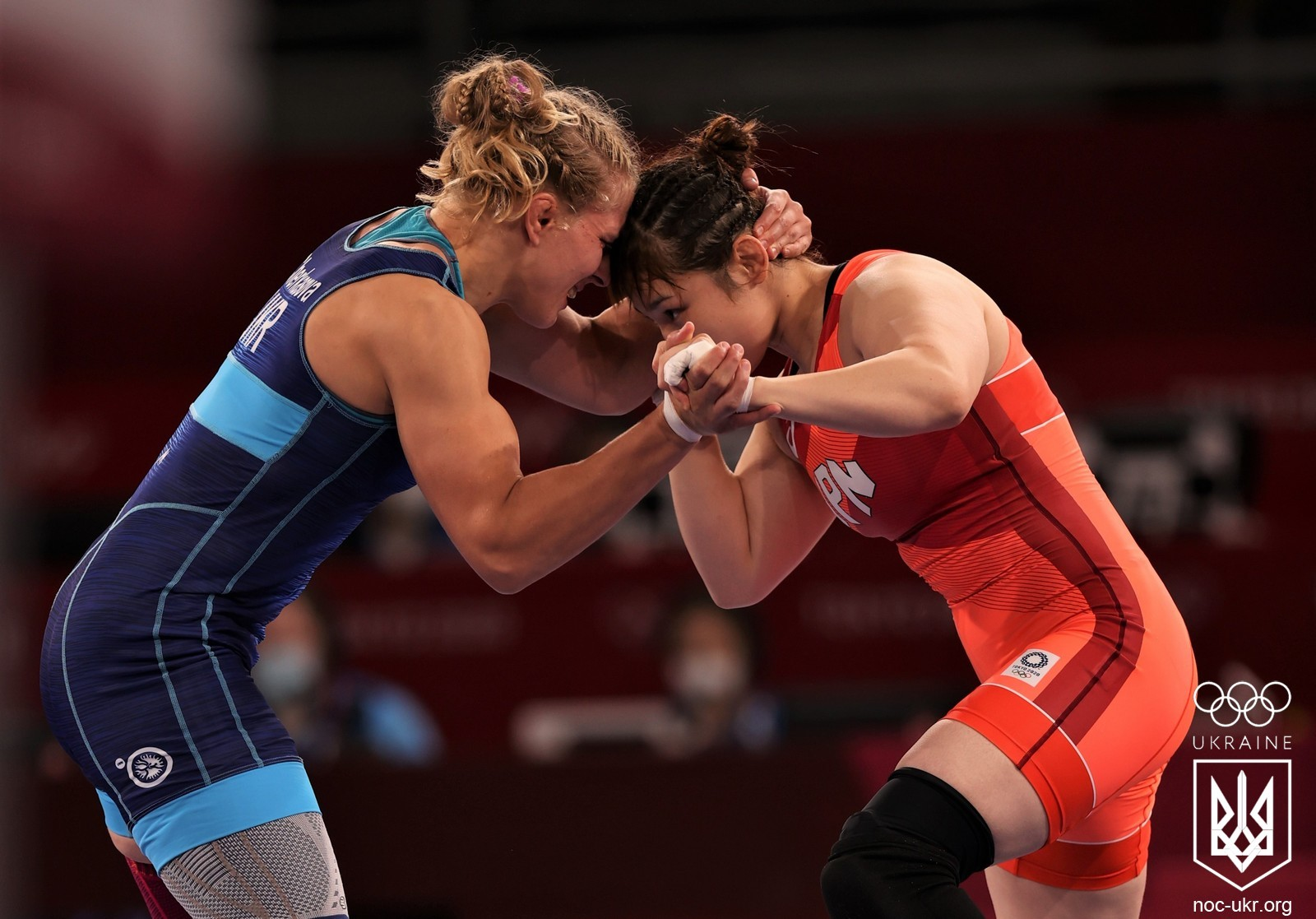
Alla Cherkasova vs Sara Dosho in the women's freestyle 68 kg bronze medal match

Freestyle

Athlete	Event	Round of 16	Quarterfinal	Semifinal	Repechage	Final / BM	
Athlete	Event	Opposition Result	Opposition Result	Opposition Result	Opposition Result	Opposition Result	Rank
Vasyl Mykhailov	Men's −74 kg	Bayramov (AZE); L 1–3 ^{PP}	Did not advance				11
Oleksandr Khotsianivskyi	Men's −125 kg	Zare (IRI); L 0–3 ^{PO}	Did not advance				16
Oksana Livach	Women's −50 kg	Idris (NGR); W 4–0 ^{ST}	Sun Yn (CHN); L 1–3 ^{PP}	Did not advance	Guzmán (CUB); W 5–0 ^{VT}	Hildebrandt (USA); L 1–4 ^{SP}	5
Tetyana Kit	Women's −57 kg	Bousetta (TUN); W 5–0 ^{VT}	Maroulis (USA); L 0–3 ^{PO}	Did not advance			10
Iryna Koliadenko	Women's −62 kg	Adeniyi (NGR); W 5–0 ^{VT}	Long J (CHN); W 5–0 ^{VT}	Tynybekova (KGZ); L 0–4 ^{ST}	Bye	Grigorjeva (LAT); W 3–1 ^{PP}	3rd place, bronze medalist(s)
Alla Cherkasova	Women's −68 kg	Wieszczek (POL); W 4–0 ^{ST}	Schell (GER); W 5–0 ^{VT}	Mensah (USA); L 1–3 ^{PP}	Bye	Dosho (JPN); W 5–0 ^{VT}	3rd place, bronze medalist(s)
Alla Belinska	Women's −76 kg	Zhou Q (CHN); L 1–3 ^{PP}	Did not advance				12

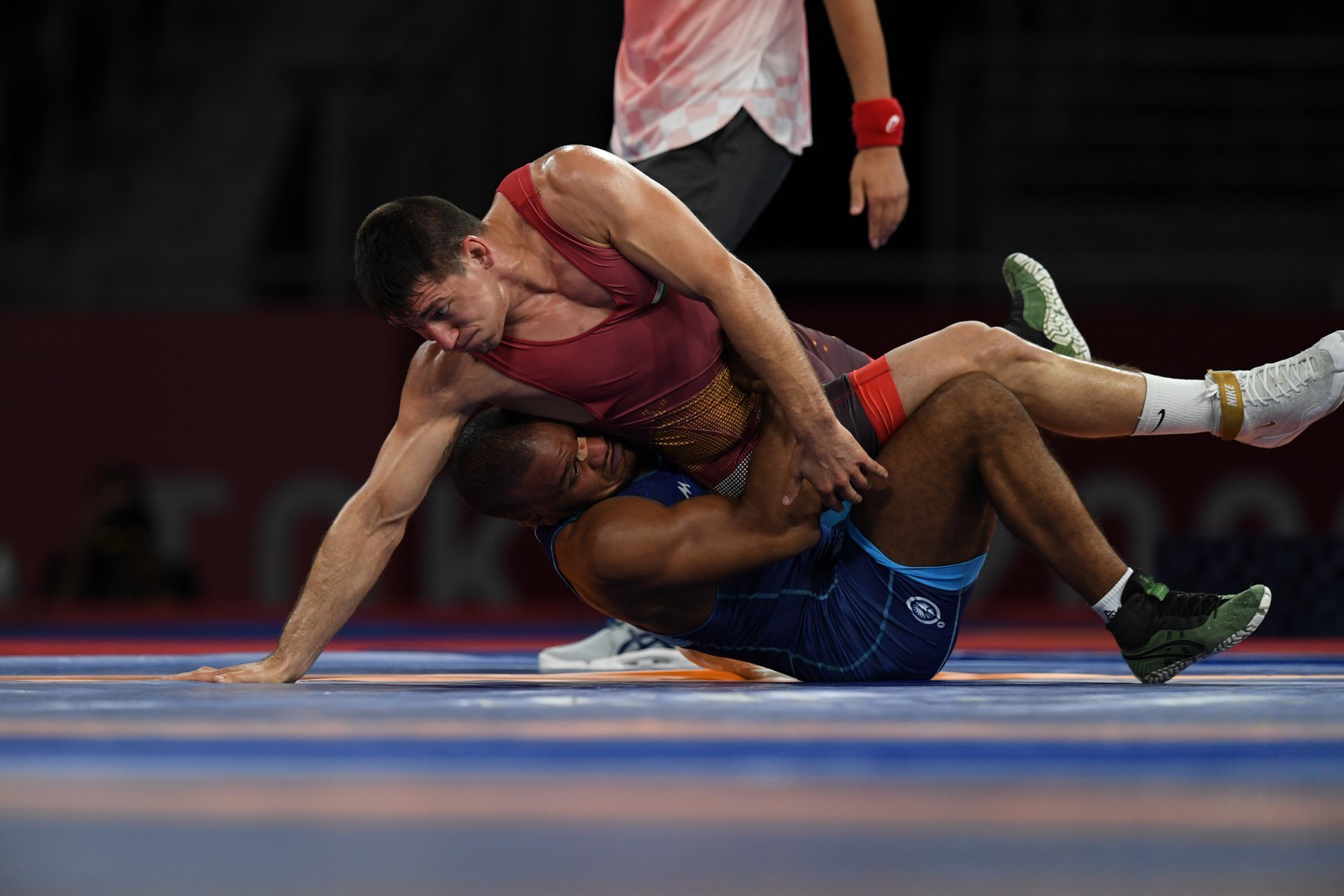
Zhan Beleniuk rolling Viktor Lőrincz in the men's Greco-Roman 87 kg final

Greco-Roman

Athlete	Event	Round of 16	Quarterfinal	Semifinal	Repechage	Final / BM	
Athlete	Event	Opposition Result	Opposition Result	Opposition Result	Opposition Result	Opposition Result	Rank
Lenur Temirov	Men's −60 kg	Tasmuradov (UZB); W 3–0 ^{PO}	Melikyan (ARM); W 3–1 ^{PP}	Fumita (JPN); L 1–3 ^{PP}	Bye	Walihan (CHN); L 1–3 ^{PP}	5
Parviz Nasibov	Men's −67 kg	Bjerrehuus (DEN); W 3–1 ^{PP}	Surkov (ROC); W 3–0 ^{PO}	El-Sayed (EGY); W 3–1 ^{PP}	Bye	Geraei (IRI); L 1–3 ^{PP}	2nd place, silver medalist(s)
Zhan Beleniuk	Men's −87 kg	Datunashvili (SRB); W 3–1 ^{PP}	Sid Azara (ALG); W 3–1 ^{PP}	Huklek (CRO); W 3–1 ^{PP}	Bye	V Lőrincz (HUN); W 3–1 ^{PP}	1st place, gold medalist(s)

== See also ==
Media related to Ukraine at the 2020 Summer Olympics at Wikimedia Commons
