= Cycling at the 2020 Summer Olympics – Women's team sprint =

Olympic cycling event

Women's team sprint at the Games of the XXXII Olympiad
- Olympic track cycling
- Venues: Izu Velodrome
- Dates: 2 August 2021
- Competitors: 16 from 8 nations
- Teams: 8
- Winning time: 31.895

Medalists
1st place, gold medalist(s)		Bao Shanju; Zhong Tianshi	China
2nd place, silver medalist(s)		Lea Friedrich; Emma Hinze	Germany
3rd place, bronze medalist(s)		Daria Shmeleva; Anastasia Voynova	ROC

The women's team sprint event at the 2020 Summer Olympics took place on 2 August 2021 at the Izu Velodrome. 16 cyclists (8 teams of 2) from 8 nations competed.

== Background ==
This was the 3rd appearance of the event, which has been held at every Summer Olympics since 2012. The reigning Olympic champions are Gong Jinjie and Zhong Tianshi of China. The reigning (2020) World Champions are Pauline Grabosch and Emma Hinze of Germany.

Russia, Germany, China, Great Britain, Australia, and the Netherlands are traditionally strong track cycling nations.

== Qualification ==
A National Olympic Committee (NOC) could enter up to 1 team of 2 cyclists in the women's team sprint. Quota places are allocated to the NOC, which selects the cyclists. Qualification is entirely through the 2018–20 UCI nation rankings. The eight top NOCs on the ranking list qualified for the team sprint event. These nations also received the right to enter two cyclists each in the individual sprint and Keirin. Because qualification was complete by the end of the 2020 UCI Track Cycling World Championships on 1 March 2020 (the last event that contributed to the 2018–20 rankings), qualification was unaffected by the COVID-19 pandemic.

== Competition format ==
The women's team sprint is competed over two-laps (500 m), with two riders for each nation. Each member of the team must lead for one of the laps. The time for a team is measured to when the first cyclist finishes. Ties are broken by splits on the last lap.

The tournament consists of an initial qualifying round that seeds the teams. The first round comprises races between two teams of two cyclists, starting on opposite sides of the track. The races are based on seeding (1st vs. 8th, 2nd vs. 7th, etc.). The winners of those four heats advance to the medal round, with the two fastest winners competing in the gold medal final and the two slower winners facing off for bronze.

== Schedule ==
All times are Japan Standard Time (UTC+9)

Date	Time	Round
2 August	15:30	Qualifying
2 August	16:50	First round
2 August	18:00	Finals

== Results ==
=== Qualifying ===
Rank	Country	Cyclists	Result	Notes
1	Germany	Lea Friedrich; Emma Hinze	32.102	
2	China	Bao Shanju; Zhong Tianshi	32.135	
3	Netherlands	Laurine van Riessen; Shanne Braspennincx	32.465	
4	ROC	Daria Shmeleva; Anastasia Voynova	32.476	
5	Mexico	Daniela Gaxiola; Yuli Verdugo	33.097	
6	Poland	Marlena Karwacka; Urszula Łoś	33.244	
7	Lithuania	Miglė Marozaitė; Simona Krupeckaitė	33.276	
8	Ukraine	Lyubov Basova; Olena Starikova	33.542	

=== First round ===
Rank	Heat	Country	Cyclists	Result	Notes
1	3	China	Bao Shanju; Zhong Tianshi	31.804	QG, WR
2	4	Germany	Lea Friedrich; Emma Hinze	31.905	QG
3	1	ROC	Daria Shmeleva; Anastasia Voynova	32.249	QB
4	2	Netherlands	Shanne Braspennincx; Laurine van Riessen	32.308	QB
5	1	Mexico	Daniela Gaxiola; Yuli Verdugo	32.701	
6	3	Lithuania	Simona Krupeckaitė; Miglė Marozaitė	32.827	NR
7	2	Poland	Marlena Karwacka; Urszula Łoś	33.022	
8	4	Ukraine	Lyubov Basova; Olena Starikova	33.285	

=== Finals ===
Rank	Country	Cyclists	Result	Notes
Gold medal final
1st place, gold medalist(s)	China	Bao Shanju; Zhong Tianshi	31.895	
2nd place, silver medalist(s)	Germany	Lea Friedrich; Emma Hinze	31.980	
Bronze medal final
3rd place, bronze medalist(s)	ROC	Daria Shmeleva; Anastasia Voynova	32.252	
4	Netherlands	Shanne Braspennincx; Laurine van Riessen	32.504	
Fifth place final
5	Lithuania	Simona Krupeckaitė; Miglė Marozaitė	32.808	NR
6	Mexico	Daniela Gaxiola; Yuli Verdugo	33.168	
Seventh place final
7	Poland	Marlena Karwacka; Urszula Łoś	33.054	
8	Ukraine	Lyubov Basova; Olena Starikova	33.691	

== Podium controversy ==
The IOC had asked China to explain the presence of Mao badges on Chinese athletes' uniforms, in particular during the medal ceremony for the women's team sprint.
