= List of Lithuanian records in track cycling =

The following are the national records in track cycling in Lithuania maintained by the Lithuanian Cycling Federation (LDSF).

== Men ==
Event	Record	Athlete	Date	Meet	Place	Ref
Flying 200 m time trial	9.476	Vasilijus Lendel	30 May 2018	Grand Prix of Moscow	Moscow, Russia	
250 m time trial (standing start)						
1 km time trial	1:02.220	Justas Beniušis	9 February 2023	European Championships	Grenchen, Switzerland	
Team sprint	44.621	Laurynas Vinskas; Vasilijus Lendel; Svajūnas Jonauskas	8 July 2021	UCI Nations Cup	Saint Petersburg, Russia	
4000m individual pursuit	4:19.732	Aivaras Mikutis	10 February 2023	European Championships	Grenchen, Switzerland	
4000m team pursuit	4:05.305	Linas Balčiūnas; Aivaras Baranauskas; Tomas Vaitkus; Raimondas Vilčinskas	14 February 2004	World Cup Classic	Moscow, Russia	

== Women ==
Event	Record	Athlete	Date	Meet	Place	Ref
Flying 200 m time trial	10.594	Simona Krupeckaitė	1 June 2019	Grand Prix of Moscow	Moscow, Russia	
250 m time trial (standing start)	18.887	Simona Krupeckaitė	2 August 2021	Olympic Games	Izu, Japan	
500 m time trial	33.296	Simona Krupeckaitė	25 March 2009	World Championships	Pruszków, Poland	
500 m time trial (sea level)	33.296	Simona Krupeckaitė	25 March 2009	World Championships	Pruszków, Poland	
Team sprint (500 m)	32.808	Simona Krupeckaitė; Miglė Marozaitė	2 August 2021	Olympic Games	Izu, Japan	
Team sprint (750 m)	52.584	Olivija Baleišytė; Lauryna Valiukevičiūtė; Akvilė Gedraitytė	1 February 2026	European Championships	Konya, Turkey	
2000m individual pursuit	2:22.311	Olivija Baleišytė	13 July 2016	European Junior Championships	Montichiari, Italy	
3000m individual pursuit	3:31.905	Vilija Sereikaitė	24 March 2010	World Championships	Ballerup, Denmark	
3000m team pursuit	3:25.237	Vilija Sereikaitė; Aušrinė Trebaitė; Vaida Pikauskaitė	19 October 2012	European Championships	Panevėžys, Lithuania	
4000m team pursuit	4:37.594	Vilija Sereikaitė; Aušrinė Trebaitė; Vaida Pikauskaitė; Roberta Pilkauskaitė	27 May 2013	Memorial of Alexander Lesnikov	Moscow, Russia	

== See also ==
- List of Lithuanian records
