= Bao Shanju =

Chinese cyclist (born 1997)

Personal information
- Born: 3 November 1997 (age 28) Luoyang, China

Cycling career
- Sport: Cycling
- Discipline: Track
- Role: Rider
Medal record
Women's track cycling
Representing China
Olympic Games
Gold medal – first place	2020 Tokyo	Team sprint
World Championships
Silver medal – second place	2022 Saint-Quentin-en-Yvelines	Team sprint
Bronze medal – third place	2023 Glasgow	Team sprint
Asian Games
Gold medal – first place	2022 Hangzhou	Team sprint
Asian Championships
Gold medal – first place	2023 Nilai	Team sprint
Gold medal – first place	2025 Nilai	Team sprint

Bao Shanju (Chinese: 鲍珊菊; born 3 November 1997) is a Chinese cyclist. She competed in the women's team sprint event at the 2020 Summer Olympics. In the first round of the event, she and teammate Zhong Tianshi set a new world record with a time of 31.804 seconds. They both went on to win the gold medal, beating the German team in the event's final.

== Career ==
Bao and her teammate Zhong Tianshi broke Team China's own world record previously set at the 2016 Rio de Janeiro Olympics by Zhong Tianshi and former team sprint teammate Gong Jinjie, with a new WR time of 31.804 seconds. While being awarded their gold medals at the podium ceremony, Bao and Zhong were seen with Mao Zedong pin-badges affixed to their team sporting jackets, alluding to symbollic patriotism, however, according to Graham Dunbar and Joe McDonald at Associated Press, this symbolism may be in breach of Olympic Charter Rule 50 (which prohibits political statements on the podium), and that this "incident came one day after silver medalist Raven Saunders (standing below gold medalist Gong Lijiao of China) crossed the wrists of her raised arms on the podium", to which Dunbar and McDonald remarked that it "was unclear" if it was "a response to the (Gong/Saunders) women's shot-put medal ceremony".
