= List of cyclists at the 2020 Summer Olympics =

This is a list of cyclists who competed at the 2020 Summer Olympics in Tokyo, Japan. The cyclists competed in 22 cycling events in the disciplines: BMX, mountain biking, road cycling, and track cycling.

Nation	Cyclist	Discipline	Event	Olympic appearance	Note
Algeria	Azzedine Lagab	Road cycling	Men's road race	2nd	
Algeria	Azzedine Lagab	Road cycling	Men's road time trial	Debut	
Algeria	Hamza Mansouri	Road cycling	Men's road race	Debut	
Argentina	Eduardo Sepúlveda	Road cycling	Men's road race	2nd	
Argentina	Sofía Gómez Villafañe	Mountain biking	Women's cross-country		
Argentina	Nicolás Torres	BMX	Men's BMX racing		
Australia	Rohan Dennis	Road cycling	Men's road time trial	2nd	
Australia	Luke Durbridge	Road cycling	Men's road race	Debut	
Australia	Lucas Hamilton	Road cycling	Men's road race	Debut	
Australia	Richie Porte	Road cycling	Men's road race	2nd	
Australia	Richie Porte	Road cycling	Men's road time trial	2nd	
Australia	Grace Brown	Road cycling	Women's road race	Debut	
Australia	Tiffany Cromwell	Road cycling	Women's road race	Debut	
Australia	Tiffany Cromwell	Road cycling	Women's road time trial	Debut	
Australia	Sarah Gigante	Road cycling	Women's road race	Debut	
Australia	Amanda Spratt	Road cycling	Women's road race	3rd	
Australia	Amanda Spratt	Road cycling	Women's road time trial	3rd	
Australia	Leigh Howard	Track cycling	Men's team pursuit	Debut	
Australia	Kelland O'Brien	Track cycling	Men's team pursuit	Debut	
Australia	Luke Plapp	Track cycling	Men's team pursuit	Debut	
Australia	Alexander Porter	Track cycling	Men's team pursuit	Debut	
Australia	Sam Welsford	Track cycling	Men's team pursuit	2nd	Rio 2016 Silver medalist
Australia	Matthew Glaetzer	Track cycling	Men's team sprint	3rd	
Australia	Nathan Hart	Track cycling	Men's team sprint	2nd	
Australia	Matthew Richardson	Track cycling	Men's team sprint	Debut	
Australia	Kaarle McCulloch	Track cycling	Women's keirin	2nd	
Australia	Kaarle McCulloch	Track cycling	Women's team sprint	2nd	London 2012 Bronze medalist
Australia	Alexandra Manly	Track cycling		Debut	
Australia	Annette Edmondson	Track cycling	Omnium - Women Women's team pursuit	3rd	London 2012 Bronze medalist
Australia	Ashlee Ankudinoff	Track cycling	Women's team pursuit	2nd	
Australia	Georgia Baker	Track cycling	Women's team pursuit	2nd	
Australia	Maeve Plouffe	Track cycling		Debut	
Australia	Rebecca McConnell	Mountain biking	Women's cross-country		
Australia	Dan McConnell	Mountain biking	Men's cross-country		
Australia	Anthony Dean	BMX	Men's BMX racing	2nd	
Australia	Logan Martin	BMX	Men's BMX freestyle	Debut	
Australia	Lauren Reynolds	BMX	Women's BMX racing	3rd	
Australia	Natalya Diehm	BMX	Women's BMX freestyle	Debut	
Australia	Saya Sakakibara	BMX	Women's BMX racing	Debut	
Austria	Anna Kiesenhofer	Road cycling	Women's road race	Debut	
Austria	Patrick Konrad	Road cycling	Men's road race	Debut	
Austria	Patrick Konrad	Road cycling	Men's road time trial	Debut	
Austria	Gregor Mühlberger	Road cycling	Men's road race	Debut	
Austria	Hermann Pernsteiner	Road cycling	Men's road race	Debut	
Austria	Laura Stigger	Mountain biking	Women's cross-country	Debut	
Austria	Max Foidl	Mountain biking	Men's cross-country		
Azerbaijan	Elchin Asadov	Road cycling	Men's road race	Debut	
Belarus	Aleksandr Riabushenko	Road cycling	Men's road race	Debut	
Belgium	Tiesj Benoot	Road cycling	Men's road race	Debut	
Belgium	Remco Evenepoel	Road cycling	Men's road race	Debut	
Belgium	Remco Evenepoel	Road cycling	Men's road time trial	Debut	
Belgium	Wout van Aert	Road cycling	Men's road race	Debut	
Belgium	Wout van Aert	Road cycling	Men's road time trial	Debut	
Belgium	Greg Van Avermaet	Road cycling	Men's road race	3rd	Rio 2016 Gold medalist
Belgium	Mauri Vansevenant	Road cycling	Men's road race	Debut	
Brazil	Jaqueline Mourão	Mountain biking	Women's cross-country		
Brazil	Henrique Avancini	Mountain biking	Men's cross-country		
Brazil	Luiz Henrique Cocuzzi	Mountain biking	Men's cross-country		
Burkina Faso	Paul Daumont	Road cycling	Men's road race	Debut	
Canada	Guillaume Boivin	Road cycling	Men's road race	Debut	
Canada	Hugo Houle	Road cycling	Men's road race	2nd	
Canada	Hugo Houle	Road cycling	Men's road time trial	2nd	
Canada	Michael Woods	Road cycling	Men's road race	2nd	
Canada	Catharine Pendrel	Mountain biking	Women's cross-country	4th	Rio 2016 Bronze medalist
Canada	Haley Smith	Mountain biking	Women's cross-country	Debut	
Canada	Peter Disera	Mountain biking	Men's cross-country	Debut	
China	Wang Ruidong	Road cycling	Men's road race	Debut	
Colombia	Esteban Chaves	Road cycling	Men's road race	2nd	
Colombia	Sergio Higuita	Road cycling	Men's road race	Debut	
Colombia	Nairo Quintana	Road cycling	Men's road race	Debut	
Colombia	Rigoberto Urán	Road cycling	Men's road race	4th	London 2012 Silver medalist
Colombia	Rigoberto Urán	Road cycling	Men's road time trial	Debut	
Costa Rica	Andrey Amador	Road cycling	Men's road race	3rd	
Croatia	Josip Rumac	Road cycling	Men's road race	Debut	
Czech Republic	Michael Kukrle	Road cycling	Men's road race	Debut	
Czech Republic	Michael Kukrle	Road cycling	Men's road time trial	Debut	
Czech Republic	Michal Schlegel	Road cycling	Men's road race	DNS	
Czech Republic	Zdeněk Štybar	Road cycling	Men's road race	2nd	
Denmark	Kasper Asgreen	Road cycling	Men's road race	Debut	
Denmark	Kasper Asgreen	Road cycling	Men's road time trial	Debut	
Denmark	Jakob Fuglsang	Road cycling	Men's road race	3rd	Rio 2016 Silver medalist
Denmark	Christopher Juul-Jensen	Road cycling	Men's road race	2nd	
Denmark	Cecilie Uttrup Ludwig	Road cycling	Women's road race	Debut	
Denmark	Emma Norsgaard Jørgensen	Road cycling	Women's road race	Debut	
Denmark	Emma Norsgaard Jørgensen	Road cycling	Women's road time trial	Debut	
Denmark	Michael Valgren	Road cycling	Men's road race	Debut	
Ecuador	Richard Carapaz	Road cycling	Men's road race	Debut	
Ecuador	Santiago Montenegro	Road cycling	Men's road time trial	Debut	
Ecuador	Jhonatan Narváez	Road cycling	Men's road race	Debut	
Eritrea	Amanuel Ghebreigzabhier	Road cycling	Men's road race	Debut	
Eritrea	Amanuel Ghebreigzabhier	Road cycling	Men's road time trial	Debut	
Eritrea	Merhawi Kudus	Road cycling	Men's road time trial	Debut	
Eritrea	Mossana Debesay	Road cycling	Women's road race	Debut	
Estonia	Tanel Kangert	Road cycling	Men's road race	3rd	
Estonia	Tanel Kangert	Road cycling	Men's road time trial	Debut	
Estonia	Peeter Pruus	Road cycling	Men's road race	Debut	
Estonia	Janika Lõiv	Mountain biking	Women's cross-country	Debut	
France	Rémi Cavagna	Road cycling	Men's road race	Debut	
France	Rémi Cavagna	Road cycling	Men's road time trial	Debut	
France	Benoît Cosnefroy	Road cycling	Men's road race	Debut	
France	Kenny Elissonde	Road cycling	Men's road race	Debut	
France	David Gaudu	Road cycling	Men's road race	Debut	
France	Guillaume Martin	Road cycling	Men's road race	Debut	
Germany	Nikias Arndt	Road cycling	Men's road race	Debut	
Germany	Nikias Arndt	Road cycling	Men's road time trial	Debut	
Germany	Emanuel Buchmann	Road cycling	Men's road race	Debut	
Germany	Simon Geschke	Road cycling	Men's road race	DNS	
Germany	Maximilian Schachmann	Road cycling	Men's road race	Debut	
Germany	Maximilian Schachmann	Road cycling	Men's road time trial	Debut	
Germany	Maximilian Brandl	Mountain biking	Men's cross-country	Debut	
Germany	Manuel Fumic	Mountain biking	Men's cross-country	5th	
Germany	Elisabeth Brandau	Mountain biking	Women's cross-country	Debut	
Germany	Ronja Eibl	Mountain biking	Women's cross-country	Debut	
Great Britain	Lizzie Deignan	Road cycling	Women's road race	3rd	London 2012 Silver Medalist
Great Britain	Anna Shackley	Road cycling	Women's road race	Debut	
Great Britain	Anna Shackley	Road cycling	Women's road time trial	Debut	
Great Britain	Tao Geoghegan Hart	Road cycling	Men's road race	Debut	
Great Britain	Tao Geoghegan Hart	Road cycling	Men's road time trial	Debut	
Great Britain	Geraint Thomas	Road cycling	Men's road race	2nd	
Great Britain	Geraint Thomas	Road cycling	Men's road time trial	2nd	
Great Britain	Adam Yates	Road cycling	Men's road race	2nd	
Great Britain	Simon Yates	Road cycling	Men's road race	Debut	
Great Britain	Evie Richards	Mountain biking	Women's cross-country	Debut	
Great Britain	Tom Pidcock	Mountain biking	Men's cross-country	Debut	
Great Britain	Beth Shriever	BMX	Women's BMX racing	Debut	
Great Britain	Kye Whyte	BMX	Men's BMX racing	Debut	
Great Britain	Charlotte Worthington	BMX	Women's BMX freestyle	Debut	
Great Britain	Declan Brooks	BMX	Men's BMX freestyle	Debut	
Greece	Polychronis Tzortzakis	Road cycling	Men's road race	Debut	
Guatemala	Manuel Rodas	Road cycling	Men's road race	3rd	
Hong Kong	Choy Hiu Fung	Road cycling	Men's road race	Debut	
Hungary	Attila Valter	Road cycling	Men's road race	Debut	
Hungary	András Parti	Mountain biking	Men's cross-country	4th	
Hungary	Kata Blanka Vas	Mountain biking	Women's cross-country	Debut	
Refugee Olympic Team	Masomah Ali Zada	Road cycling	Women's road time trial	Debut	Originally from Afghanistan
Refugee Olympic Team	Ahmad Wais	Road cycling	Men's road race	Debut	Originally from Syria
Refugee Olympic Team	Ahmad Wais	Road cycling	Men's road time trial	Debut	Originally from Syria
Iran	Saeid Safarzadeh	Road cycling	Men's road race	Debut	
Iran	Saeid Safarzadeh	Road cycling	Men's road time trial	Debut	
Ireland	Eddie Dunbar	Road cycling	Men's road race	Debut	
Ireland	Dan Martin	Road cycling	Men's road race	3rd	
Ireland	Nicolas Roche	Road cycling	Men's road race	4th	
Ireland	Nicolas Roche	Road cycling	Men's road time trial	Debut	
Italy	Alberto Bettiol	Road cycling	Men's road race	Debut	
Italy	Alberto Bettiol	Road cycling	Men's road time trial	Debut	
Italy	Damiano Caruso	Road cycling	Men's road race	2nd	
Italy	Giulio Ciccone	Road cycling	Men's road race	Debut	
Italy	Filippo Ganna	Road cycling	Men's road time trial	Debut	
Italy	Gianni Moscon	Road cycling	Men's road race	Debut	
Italy	Vincenzo Nibali	Road cycling	Men's road race	4th	
Japan	Yukiya Arashiro	Road cycling	Men's road race	3rd	
Japan	Nariyuki Masuda	Road cycling	Men's road race	Debut	
Japan	Minato Oike	BMX	Women's freestyle	Debut	
Kazakhstan	Dmitriy Gruzdev	Road cycling	Men's road race	Debut	
Kazakhstan	Alexey Lutsenko	Road cycling	Men's road race	Debut	
Kazakhstan	Alexey Lutsenko	Road cycling	Men's road time trial	Debut	
Kazakhstan	Vadim Pronskiy	Road cycling	Men's road race	Debut	
Latvia	Krists Neilands	Road cycling	Men's road race	Debut	
Latvia	Toms Skujiņš	Road cycling	Men's road race	2nd	
Latvia	Toms Skujiņš	Road cycling	Men's road time trial	Debut	
Lithuania	Evaldas Šiškevičius	Road cycling	Men's road race	Debut	
Lithuania	Rasa Leleivytė	Road cycling	Women's road race	Debut	
Lithuania	Simona Krupeckaitė	Track cycling	Women's sprint	5th	
Lithuania	Simona Krupeckaitė	Track cycling	Women's team sprint	5th	
Lithuania	Simona Krupeckaitė	Track cycling	Women's keirin	5th	
Lithuania	Miglė Marozaitė	Track cycling	Women's sprint	Debut	
Lithuania	Miglė Marozaitė	Track cycling	Women's team sprint	Debut	
Lithuania	Miglė Marozaitė	Track cycling	Women's keirin	Debut	
Luxembourg	Kevin Geniets	Road cycling	Men's road race	Debut	
Luxembourg	Michel Ries	Road cycling	Men's road race	Debut	
Malaysia	Azizulhasni Awang	Track cycling	Men's keirin	4th	Rio 2016 Bronze medalist
Malaysia	Azizulhasni Awang	Track cycling	Men's sprint	3rd	
Malaysia	Shah Firdaus Sahrom	Track cycling	Men's keirin	Debut	
Malaysia	Shah Firdaus Sahrom	Track cycling	Men's sprint	Debut	
Mexico	Eder Frayre	Road cycling	Men's road race	Debut	
Mexico	Lizbeth Salazar	Road cycling	Women's road race	Debut	
Mexico	Lizbeth Salazar	Road cycling	Women's road time trial	Debut	
Mexico	Daniela Gaxiola	Track cycling	Women's sprint	Debut	
Mexico	Daniela Gaxiola	Track cycling	Women's team sprint	Debut	
Mexico	Daniela Gaxiola	Track cycling	Women's keirin	Debut	
Mexico	Yuli Verdugo	Track cycling	Women's sprint	Debut	
Mexico	Yuli Verdugo	Track cycling	Women's team sprint	Debut	
Mexico	Yuli Verdugo	Track cycling	Women's keirin	Debut	
Mexico	Victoria Velasco	Track cycling	Women's omnium	Debut	
Mexico	Gerardo Ulloa	Mountain biking	Men's cross-country	Debut	
Mexico	Daniela Campuzano	Mountain biking	Women's cross-country	2nd	
Morocco	Mohcine El Kouraji	Road cycling	Men's road race	Debut	
Namibia	Tristan de Lange	Road cycling	Men's road race	Debut	
Netherlands	Anna van der Breggen	Road cycling	Women's road race	2nd	Rio 2016 Gold medalist
Netherlands	Anna van der Breggen	Road cycling	Women's road time trial	2nd	Rio 2016 Bronze medalist
Netherlands	Annemiek van Vleuten	Road cycling	Women's road race	4th	
Netherlands	Annemiek van Vleuten	Road cycling	Women's road time trial	4th	
Netherlands	Demi Vollering	Road cycling	Women's road race	Debut	
Netherlands	Marianne Vos	Road cycling	Women's road race	4th	London 2012 Gold medalist
Netherlands	Tom Dumoulin	Road cycling	Men's road race	2nd	
Netherlands	Tom Dumoulin	Road cycling	Men's road time trial	2nd	Rio 2016 Silver medalist
Netherlands	Yoeri Havik	Road cycling	Men's road race	Debut	
Netherlands	Wilco Kelderman	Road cycling	Men's road race	Debut	
Netherlands	Bauke Mollema	Road cycling	Men's road race	2nd	
Netherlands	Dylan van Baarle	Road cycling	Men's road race	Debut	
Netherlands	Anne Tauber	Mountain biking	Women's cross-country	Debut	
Netherlands	Anne Terpstra	Mountain biking	Women's cross-country	Debut	
Netherlands	Mathieu van der Poel	Mountain biking	Men's cross-country	Debut	
Netherlands	Milan Vader	Mountain biking	Men's cross-country	Debut	
Netherlands	Joris Harmsen	BMX	Men's race	Debut	
Netherlands	Niek Kimmann	BMX	Men's race	2nd	
Netherlands	Twan van Gendt	BMX	Men's race	3rd	
Netherlands	Judy Baauw	BMX	Women's race	Debut	
Netherlands	Laura Smulders	BMX	Women's race	3rd	
Netherlands	Merel Smulders	BMX	Women's race	Debut	
New Zealand	George Bennett	Road cycling	Men's road race	2nd	
New Zealand	George Bennett	Road cycling	Men's road time trial	2nd	
New Zealand	Patrick Bevin	Road cycling	Men's road race	Debut	
New Zealand	Patrick Bevin	Road cycling	Men's road time trial	Debut	
New Zealand	Anton Cooper	Mountain biking	Men's cross-country	Debut	
New Zealand	Rebecca Petch	BMX	Women's race	Debut	
Norway	Tobias Foss	Road cycling	Men's road race	Debut	
Norway	Tobias Foss	Road cycling	Men's road time trial	Debut	
Norway	Markus Hoelgaard	Road cycling	Men's road race	Debut	
Norway	Tobias Halland Johannessen	Road cycling	Men's road race	Debut	
Norway	Andreas Leknessund	Road cycling	Men's road race	Debut	
Panama	Christofer Jurado	Road cycling	Men's road race	Debut	
Peru	Royner Navarro	Road cycling	Men's road race	Debut	
Poland	Maciej Bodnar	Road cycling	Men's road race	3rd	
Poland	Maciej Bodnar	Road cycling	Men's road time trial	3rd	
Poland	Michał Kwiatkowski	Road cycling	Men's road race	3rd	
Poland	Rafał Majka	Road cycling	Men's road race	2nd	Rio 2016 Bronze medalist
Poland	Anna Plichta	Road cycling	Women's road race	2nd	
Poland	Anna Plichta	Road cycling	Women's road time trial	2nd	
Poland	Katarzyna Niewiadoma	Road cycling	Women's road race	2nd	
Poland	Marta Lach	Road cycling	Women's road race	2nd	
Poland	Szymon Sajnok	Track cycling	Omnium	Debut	
Poland	Szymon Sajnok	Track cycling	Madison	Debut	
Poland	Daniel Staniszewski	Track cycling	Madison	Debut	
Poland	Patryk Rajkowski	Track cycling	Men's sprint	Debut	
Poland	Patryk Rajkowski	Track cycling	Men's team sprint	Debut	
Poland	Mateusz Rudyk	Track cycling	Men's sprint	Debut	
Poland	Mateusz Rudyk	Track cycling	Men's team sprint	Debut	
Poland	Mateusz Rudyk	Track cycling	Men's keirin	Debut	
Poland	Krzysztof Maksel	Track cycling	Men's team sprint	Debut	
Poland	Krzysztof Maksel	Track cycling	Men's keirin	Debut	
Poland	Daria Pikulik	Track cycling	Women's omnium	2nd	
Poland	Daria Pikulik	Track cycling	Women's madison	2nd	
Poland	Wiktoria Pikulik	Track cycling	Women's madison	Debut	
Poland	Marlena Karwacka	Track cycling	Women's sprint	Debut	
Poland	Marlena Karwacka	Track cycling	Women's team sprint	Debut	
Poland	Marlena Karwacka	Track cycling	Women's keirin	Debut	
Poland	Urszula Łoś	Track cycling	Women's sprint	Debut	
Poland	Urszula Łoś	Track cycling	Women's team sprint	Debut	
Poland	Urszula Łoś	Track cycling	Women's keirin	Debut	
Poland	Bartłomiej Wawak	Mountain biking	Men's cross-country	Debut	
Poland	Maja Włoszczowska	Mountain biking	Women's cross-country	3rd	
Portugal	João Almeida	Road cycling	Men's road race	Debut	
Portugal	João Almeida	Road cycling	Men's road time trial	Debut	
Portugal	Nelson Oliveira	Road cycling	Men's road race	3rd	
Portugal	Nelson Oliveira	Road cycling	Men's road time trial	3rd	
Romania	Eduard-Michael Grosu	Road cycling	Men's road race	Debut	
ROC	Pavel Sivakov	Road cycling	Men's road race	Debut	
ROC	Aleksandr Vlasov	Road cycling	Men's road race	Debut	
ROC	Aleksandr Vlasov	Road cycling	Men's road time trial	Debut	
ROC	Ilnur Zakarin	Road cycling	Men's road race	Debut	
Rwanda	Moise Mugisha	Road cycling	Men's road race	Debut	
Slovakia	Juraj Sagan	Road cycling	Men's road race	Debut	
Slovakia	Lukáš Kubiš	Road cycling	Men's road race	Debut	
Slovakia	Lukáš Kubiš	Road cycling	Men's road time trial	Debut	
Slovenia	Tadej Pogačar	Road cycling	Men's road race	Debut	
Slovenia	Jan Polanc	Road cycling	Men's road race	2nd	
Slovenia	Primož Roglič	Road cycling	Men's road race	2nd	
Slovenia	Primož Roglič	Road cycling	Men's road time trial	2nd	
Slovenia	Jan Tratnik	Road cycling	Men's road race	Debut	
Slovenia	Eugenia Bujak	Road cycling	Women's road race	Debut	
Slovenia	Tanja Žakelj	Mountain biking	Women's cross-country	3rd	
South Africa	Stefan de Bod	Road cycling	Men's road race	Debut	
South Africa	Stefan de Bod	Road cycling	Men's road time trial	Debut	
South Africa	Nicholas Dlamini	Road cycling	Men's road race	Debut	
South Africa	Ryan Gibbons	Road cycling	Men's road race	Debut	
South Africa	Ashleigh Moolman	Road cycling	Women's road race	3rd	
South Africa	Ashleigh Moolman	Road cycling	Women's road time trial	3rd	
South Africa	Carla Oberholzer	Road cycling	Women's road race	Debut	
South Africa	Jean Spies	Track cycling	Men's sprint	Debut	
South Africa	Jean Spies	Track cycling	Men's keirin	Debut	
South Africa	David Maree	Track cycling	Men's omnium	Debut	
South Africa	Charlene du Preez	Track cycling	Women's sprint	Debut	
South Africa	Charlene du Preez	Track cycling	Women's keirin	Debut	
South Africa	Alan Hatherly	Mountain biking	Men's cross-country	2nd	
South Africa	Candice Lill	Mountain biking	Women's cross-country	Debut	
South Africa	Alex Limberg	BMX	Men's race	Debut	
Spain	Omar Fraile	Road cycling	Men's road race	Debut	
Spain	Jesús Herrada	Road cycling	Men's road race	Debut	
Spain	Gorka Izagirre	Road cycling	Men's road race	Debut	
Spain	Ion Izagirre	Road cycling	Men's road race	2nd	
Spain	Ion Izagirre	Road cycling	Men's road time trial	2nd	
Spain	Alejandro Valverde	Road cycling	Men's road race	5th	
Spain	Mavi García	Road cycling	Women's road race	Debut	
Spain	Mavi García	Road cycling	Women's road time trial	Debut	
Spain	Ane Santesteban	Road cycling	Men's road race	2nd	
Spain	Albert Torres	Track cycling	Omnium	2nd	
Spain	Albert Torres	Track cycling	Madison	2nd	
Spain	Sebastián Mora	Track cycling	Madison	2nd	
Spain	Jofre Cullell	Mountain biking	Men's cross-country	Debut	
Spain	David Valero	Mountain biking	Men's cross-country	2nd	
Spain	Rocío del Alba García	Mountain biking	Women's cross-country	Debut	
Suriname	Jair Tjon En Fa	Track cycling	Men's sprint	Debut	
Suriname	Jair Tjon En Fa	Track cycling	Men's keirin	Debut	
Switzerland	Marc Hirschi	Road cycling	Men's road race	Debut	
Switzerland	Stefan Küng	Road cycling	Men's road race	Debut	
Switzerland	Stefan Küng	Road cycling	Men's road time trial	Debut	
Switzerland	Gino Mäder	Road cycling	Men's road race	Debut	
Switzerland	Gino Mäder	Road cycling	Men's road time trial	Debut	
Switzerland	Michael Schär	Road cycling	Men's road race	2nd	
Switzerland	Filippo Colombo	Mountain biking	Men's cross-country	Debut	
Switzerland	Mathias Flückiger	Mountain biking	Men's cross-country	2nd	
Switzerland	Nino Schurter	Mountain biking	Men's cross-country	4th	Rio 2016 Gold medalist London 2012 Silver medalist Beijing 2008 Bronze medalist
Switzerland	Sina Frei	Mountain biking	Women's cross-country	Debut	
Switzerland	Linda Indergand	Mountain biking	Women's cross-country	2nd	
Switzerland	Jolanda Neff	Mountain biking	Women's cross-country	2nd	
Chinese Taipei	Feng Chun-kai	Road cycling	Men's road race	Debut	
Thailand	Jutatip Maneephan	Road cycling	Women's road race	3rd	
Thailand	Chutikan Kitwanitsathian	BMX	Women's race	Debut	
Trinidad and Tobago	Teniel Campbell	Road cycling	Women's road race	Debut	
Trinidad and Tobago	Kwesi Browne	Track cycling	Men's sprint	Debut	
Trinidad and Tobago	Kwesi Browne	Track cycling	Men's keirin	Debut	
Trinidad and Tobago	Nicholas Paul	Track cycling	Men's sprint	Debut	
Trinidad and Tobago	Nicholas Paul	Track cycling	Men's keirin	Debut	
Turkey	Onur Balkan	Road cycling	Men's road race	2nd	
Turkey	Ahmet Örken	Road cycling	Men's road race	2nd	
Ukraine	Anatoliy Budyak	Road cycling	Men's road race	Debut	
United States	Lawson Craddock	Road cycling	Men's road race	Debut	
United States	Lawson Craddock	Road cycling	Men's road time trial	Debut	
United States	Brandon McNulty	Road cycling	Men's road race	Debut	
United States	Brandon McNulty	Road cycling	Men's road time trial	Debut	
United States	Chloé Dygert	Road cycling	Women's road race	2nd	
United States	Chloé Dygert	Road cycling	Women's road time trial	2nd	
United States	Coryn Rivera	Road cycling	Women's road race	Debut	
United States	Leah Thomas	Road cycling	Women's road race	Debut	
United States	Ruth Winder	Road cycling	Women's road race	2nd	
United States	Amber Neben	Road cycling	Women's road time trial	3rd	
United States	Gavin Hoover	Track cycling	Omnium	Debut	
United States	Gavin Hoover	Track cycling	Madison	Debut	
United States	Adrian Hegyvary	Track cycling	Madison	Debut	
United States	Madalyn Godby	Track cycling	Women's sprint	Debut	
United States	Madalyn Godby	Track cycling	Women's keirin	Debut	
United States	Christopher Blevins	Mountain biking	Men's cross-country	Debut	
United States	Haley Batten	Mountain biking	Women's cross-country	Debut	
United States	Kate Courtney	Mountain biking	Women's cross-country	Debut	
United States	Chloe Woodruff	Mountain biking	Women's cross-country	2nd	
United States	Connor Fields	BMX	Men's race	3rd	
United States	Corben Sharrah	BMX	Men's race	2nd	
United States	Justin Dowell	BMX	Men's freestyle	Debut	
United States	Nick Bruce	BMX	Men's freestyle	Debut	
United States	Payton Ridenour	BMX	Women's race	Debut	
United States	Felicia Stancil	BMX	Women's race	Debut	
United States	Alise Willoughby	BMX	Women's race	3rd	
United States	Perris Benegas	BMX	Women's freestyle	Debut	
United States	Hannah Roberts	BMX	Women's freestyle	Debut	
Uzbekistan	Muradjan Khalmuratov	Road cycling	Men's road race	2nd	
Venezuela	Orluis Aular	Road cycling	Men's road race	Debut	
Venezuela	Daniel Dhers	BMX	Men's freestyle	Debut	
