= 2019 UCI Track Cycling World Championships – Women's sprint =

Women's sprint at the 2019 UCI Track Cycling World Championships
- Venue: BGŻ Arena
- Location: Pruszków, Poland
- Dates: 28 February–1 March
- Competitors: 33 from 22 nations

Medalists
| gold medal | Lee Wai Sze | Hong Kong |
| silver medal | Stephanie Morton | Australia |
| bronze medal | Mathilde Gros | France |

The Women's sprint competition at the 2019 UCI Track Cycling World Championships was held on 28 February and 1 March 2019.

== Results ==
=== Qualifying ===
The qualifying was started on 28 February at 14:53. The top four riders advanced directly to the 1/8 finals; places 5 to 28 advanced to the 1/16 final.

| Rank | Name | Nation | Time | Behind | Notes |
|---|---|---|---|---|---|
| 1 | Stephanie Morton | Australia | 10.546 | | Q |
| 2 | Lee Wai Sze | Hong Kong | 10.662 | +0.116 | Q |
| 3 | Mathilde Gros | France | 10.685 | +0.139 | Q |
| 4 | Lea Friedrich | Germany | 10.712 | +0.166 | Q |
| 5 | Daria Shmeleva | Russia | 10.728 | +0.182 | q |
| 6 | Kaarle McCulloch | Australia | 10.742 | +0.196 | q |
| 7 | Emma Hinze | Germany | 10.766 | +0.220 | q |
| 8 | Olena Starikova | Ukraine | 10.783 | +0.237 | q |
| 9 | Natasha Hansen | New Zealand | 10.865 | +0.319 | q |
| 10 | Anastasia Voynova | Russia | 10.870 | +0.324 | q |
| 11 | Laurine van Riessen | Netherlands | 10.886 | +0.340 | q |
| 12 | Lauriane Genest | Canada | 10.905 | +0.359 | q |
| 13 | Katy Marchant | Great Britain | 10.931 | +0.385 | q |
| 14 | Simona Krupeckaitė | Lithuania | 10.945 | +0.399 | q |
| 15 | Daniela Gaxiola | Mexico | 10.969 | +0.423 | q |
| 16 | Jessica Lee Hoi Yan | Hong Kong | 10.972 | +0.426 | q |
| 17 | Madalyn Godby | United States | 11.069 | +0.523 | q |
| 18 | Hetty van de Wouw | Netherlands | 11.073 | +0.527 | q |
| 19 | Lin Junhong | China | 11.078 | +0.532 | q |
| 20 | Miglė Marozaitė | Lithuania | 11.094 | +0.548 | q |
| 21 | Tania Calvo | Spain | 11.097 | +0.551 | q |
| 22 | Lee Hye-jin | South Korea | 11.100 | +0.554 | q |
| 23 | Olivia Podmore | New Zealand | 11.126 | +0.580 | q |
| 24 | Yuka Kobayashi | Japan | 11.181 | +0.635 | q |
| 25 | Martha Bayona | Colombia | 11.237 | +0.691 | q |
| 26 | Nicky Degrendele | Belgium | 11.237 | +0.691 | q |
| 27 | Mandy Marquardt | United States | 11.238 | +0.692 | q |
| 28 | Natalia Antonova | Russia | 11.259 | +0.713 | q |
| 29 | Robyn Stewart | Ireland | 11.339 | +0.793 | |
| 30 | Lyubov Basova | Ukraine | 11.342 | +0.796 | |
| 31 | Marlena Karwacka | Poland | 11.349 | +0.803 | |
| 32 | Li Yin Yin | Hong Kong | 11.699 | +1.153 | |
| 33 | Charlene du Preez | South Africa | 11.710 | +1.164 | |

=== 1/16 finals ===
The 1/16 finals were started on 28 February at 15:58. Heat winners advanced to the 1/8 finals.

| Heat | Rank | Name | Nation | Gap | Notes |
|---|---|---|---|---|---|
| 1 | 1 | Daria Shmeleva | Russia | | Q |
| 1 | 2 | Natalia Antonova | Russia | +0.006 | |
| 2 | 1 | Kaarle McCulloch | Australia | | Q |
| 2 | 2 | Mandy Marquardt | United States | +0.166 | |
| 3 | 1 | Emma Hinze | Germany | | Q |
| 3 | 2 | Nicky Degrendele | Belgium | +0.544 | |
| 4 | 1 | Olena Starikova | Ukraine | | Q |
| 4 | 2 | Martha Bayona | Colombia | +0.077 | |
| 5 | 1 | Natasha Hansen | New Zealand | | Q |
| 5 | 2 | Yuka Kobayashi | Japan | +0.559 | |
| 6 | 1 | Anastasia Voynova | Russia | | Q |
| 6 | 2 | Olivia Podmore | New Zealand | +0.304 | |
| 7 | 1 | Laurine van Riessen | Netherlands | | Q |
| 7 | 2 | Lee Hye-jin | South Korea | +0.049 | |
| 8 | 1 | Tania Calvo | Spain | | Q |
| 8 | 2 | Lauriane Genest | Canada | +0.058 | |
| 9 | 1 | Katy Marchant | Great Britain | | Q |
| 9 | 2 | Miglė Marozaitė | Lithuania | +0.097 | |
| 10 | 1 | Simona Krupeckaitė | Lithuania | | Q |
| 10 | 2 | Lin Junhong | China | +0.056 | |
| 11 | 1 | Daniela Gaxiola | Mexico | | Q |
| 11 | 2 | Hetty van de Wouw | Netherlands | +0.109 | |
| 12 | 1 | Madalyn Godby | United States | | Q |
| 12 | 2 | Jessica Lee Hoi Yan | Hong Kong | +0.020 | |

=== 1/8 finals ===
The 1/8 finals were started on 28 February at 16:50. Heat winners advanced to the quarterfinals.

| Heat | Rank | Name | Nation | Gap | Notes |
|---|---|---|---|---|---|
| 1 | 1 | Stephanie Morton | Australia | | Q |
| 1 | 2 | Madalyn Godby | United States | +0.179 | |
| 2 | 1 | Lee Wai Sze | Hong Kong | | Q |
| 2 | 2 | Daniela Gaxiola | Mexico | +0.221 | |
| 3 | 1 | Mathilde Gros | France | | Q |
| 3 | 2 | Simona Krupeckaitė | Lithuania | +0.226 | |
| 4 | 1 | Lea Friedrich | Germany | | Q |
| 4 | 2 | Katy Marchant | Great Britain | +0.133 | |
| 5 | 1 | Tania Calvo | Spain | | Q |
| 5 | 2 | Daria Shmeleva | Russia | Relegated | |
| 6 | 1 | Laurine van Riessen | Netherlands | | Q |
| 6 | 2 | Kaarle McCulloch | Australia | +0.049 | |
| 7 | 1 | Anastasia Voynova | Russia | | Q |
| 7 | 2 | Emma Hinze | Germany | +0.013 | |
| 8 | 1 | Olena Starikova | Ukraine | | Q |
| 8 | 2 | Natasha Hansen | New Zealand | +0.080 | |

=== Quarterfinals ===
The quarterfinals were started 28 February at 18:58. Matches were extended to a best-of-three format hereon; winners proceeded to the semifinals.

| Heat | Rank | Name | Nation | Race 1 | Race 2 | Decider (i.r.) | Notes |
|---|---|---|---|---|---|---|---|
| 1 | 1 | Stephanie Morton | Australia | X | X | | Q |
| 1 | 2 | Olena Starikova | Ukraine | +0.082 | +0.040 | | |
| 2 | 1 | Lee Wai Sze | Hong Kong | X | X | | Q |
| 2 | 2 | Anastasia Voynova | Russia | +0.184 | +0.405 | | |
| 3 | 1 | Mathilde Gros | France | X | X | | Q |
| 3 | 2 | Laurine van Riessen | Netherlands | +0.011 | +0.345 | | |
| 4 | 1 | Lea Friedrich | Germany | X | X | | Q |
| 4 | 2 | Tania Calvo | Spain | +0.064 | +0.046 | | |

=== Semifinals ===
The semifinals were started on 1 March at 19:22.

| Heat | Rank | Name | Nation | Race 1 | Race 2 | Decider (i.r.) | Notes |
|---|---|---|---|---|---|---|---|
| 1 | 1 | Stephanie Morton | Australia | X | X | | Q |
| 1 | 2 | Lea Friedrich | Germany | +0.156 | +0.154 | | |
| 2 | 1 | Lee Wai Sze | Hong Kong | X | X | | Q |
| 2 | 2 | Mathilde Gros | France | +0.047 | +0.052 | | |

=== Finals ===
The finals were started on 1 March at 20:47.

| Rank | Name | Nation | Race 1 | Race 2 | Decider (i.r.) |
|---|---|---|---|---|---|
Gold medal race
| 1st place, gold medalist(s) | Lee Wai Sze | Hong Kong | X | X | |
| 2nd place, silver medalist(s) | Stephanie Morton | Australia | +0.054 | +0.135 | |
Bronze medal race
| 3rd place, bronze medalist(s) | Mathilde Gros | France | X | X | |
| 4 | Lea Friedrich | Germany | +0.091 | +0.164 | |
