= 2019 UCI Track Cycling World Championships – Women's keirin =

Women's keirin at the 2019 UCI Track Cycling World Championships
- Venue: BGŻ Arena
- Location: Pruszków, Poland
- Dates: 3 March
- Competitors: 26 from 21 nations

Medalists
gold medal	Lee Wai Sze	Hong Kong
silver medal	Kaarle McCulloch	Australia
bronze medal	Daria Shmeleva	Russia

The Women's keirin competition at the 2019 UCI Track Cycling World Championships was held on 3 March 2019.

== Results ==
=== First round ===
The first round was started at 12:08. The first two riders from each heat qualified for the next round, all other riders moved to the repechages.

Heat 1

Rank	Name	Nation	Gap	Notes
1	Shanne Braspennincx	Netherlands		Q
2	Nicky Degrendele	Belgium	+0.042	Q
3	Lauriane Genest	Canada	+0.076	
4	Lee Hye-jin	South Korea	+0.159	
5	Olivia Podmore	New Zealand	+0.333	

Heat 3

Rank	Name	Nation	Gap	Notes
1	Laurine van Riessen	Netherlands		Q
2	Yuka Kobayashi	Japan	+0.159	Q
3	Mathilde Gros	France	+0.532	
4	Urszula Łoś	Poland	+0.676	
—	Jessica Lee	Hong Kong	Relegated	

Heat 5

Rank	Name	Nation	Gap	Notes
1	Stephanie Morton	Australia		Q
2	Riyu Ohta	Japan	+0.139	Q
3	Martha Bayona	Colombia	+1.090	
4	Lyubov Basova	Ukraine	+1.180	
5	Sandie Clair	France	+1.310	
6	Charlene Du Perez	South Africa	+1.368	

Heat 2

Rank	Name	Nation	Gap	Notes
1	Lee Wai Sze	Hong Kong		Q
2	Simona Krupeckaitė	Lithuania	+0.046	Q
3	Emma Hinze	Germany	+0.226	
4	Katy Marchant	Great Britain	+0.477	
5	Anastasia Voynova	Russia	+0.760	

Heat 4

Rank	Name	Nation	Gap	Notes
1	Daria Shmeleva	Russia		Q
2	Madalyn Godby	United States	+0.075	Q
3	Lin Junhong	China	+0.100	
4	Kaarle McCulloch	Australia	+0.184	
5	Helena Casas	Spain	+0.263	

=== First round repechage ===
The first round repechage was started at 12:49. The first two riders of each heat qualified for the quarterfinals.

Heat 1

Rank	Name	Nation	Gap	Notes
1	Kaarle McCulloch	Australia		Q
2	Lauriane Genest	Canada	+0.032	Q
3	Charlene Du Perez	South Africa	+0.294	
4	Lyubov Basova	Ukraine	+0.298	

Heat 3

Rank	Name	Nation	Gap	Notes
1	Jessica Lee	Hong Kong		Q
2	Katy Marchant	Great Britain	+0.200	Q
3	Helena Casas	Spain	+0.350	
—	Olivia Podmore	New Zealand	Relegated	

Heat 2

Rank	Name	Nation	Gap	Notes
1	Mathilde Gros	France		Q
2	Lee Hye-jin	South Korea	+0.319	Q
3	Emma Hinze	Germany	+0.420	
—	Sandie Clair	France	Relegated	

Heat 4

Rank	Name	Nation	Gap	Notes
1	Anastasia Voynova	Russia		Q
2	Lin Junhong	China	+0.197	Q
3	Martha Bayona	Colombia	+0.233	
4	Urszula Łoś	Poland	+0.728	

=== Quarterfinals ===
The quarterfinals were started at 14:45. The first four riders from each heat qualified for the semifinals.

Heat 1

Rank	Name	Nation	Gap	Notes
1	Mathilde Gros	France		Q
2	Simona Krupeckaitė	Lithuania	+0.040	Q
3	Shanne Braspennincx	Netherlands	+0.064	Q
4	Daria Shmeleva	Russia	+0.088	Q
5	Lin Junhong	China	+1.850	
6	Jessica Lee	Hong Kong		

Heat 3

Rank	Name	Nation	Gap	Notes
1	Lee Hye-jin	South Korea		Q
2	Laurine van Riessen	Netherlands	+0.020	Q
3	Madalyn Godby	United States	+0.024	Q
4	Nicky Degrendele	Belgium	+0.024	Q
5	Lauriane Genest	Canada	+0.182	
6	Riyu Ohta	Japan	+0.981	

Heat 2

Rank	Name	Nation	Gap	Notes
1	Stephanie Morton	Australia		Q
2	Lee Wai Sze	Hong Kong	+0.092	Q
3	Kaarle McCulloch	Australia	+0.116	Q
4	Anastasia Voynova	Russia	+0.152	Q
5	Yuka Kobayashi	Japan	+0.230	
6	Katy Marchant	Great Britain	+0.279	

=== Semifinals ===
The semifinals were started at 15:59. The first three riders from each qualified for the final.

Heat 1

Rank	Name	Nation	Gap	Notes
1	Lee Wai Sze	Hong Kong		Q
2	Mathilde Gros	France	+0.214	Q
3	Kaarle McCulloch	Australia	+0.566	Q
4	Madalyn Godby	United States	+0.687	
5	Simona Krupeckaitė	Lithuania	+0.777	
6	Nicky Degrendele	Belgium	Relegated	

Heat 2

Rank	Name	Nation	Gap	Notes
1	Stephanie Morton	Australia		Q
2	Shanne Braspennincx	Netherlands	+0.066	Q
3	Daria Shmeleva	Russia	+0.143	Q
4	Anastasia Voynova	Russia	+0.200	
5	Lee Hye-jin	South Korea	+0.220	
6	Laurine van Riessen	Netherlands	+0.512	

=== Finals ===
The finals were started at 16:40.

==== Small final ====
Rank	Name	Nation	Gap	Notes
7	Laurine van Riessen	Netherlands		
8	Madalyn Godby	United States	+0.258	
9	Lee Hye-jin	South Korea	+0.283	
10	Nicky Degrendele	Belgium	+0.342	
11	Anastasia Voynova	Russia	+0.367	
12	Simona Krupeckaitė	Lithuania	+0.495	

==== Final ====
Rank	Name	Nation	Gap	Notes
1st place, gold medalist(s)	Lee Wai Sze	Hong Kong		
2nd place, silver medalist(s)	Kaarle McCulloch	Australia	+0.118	
3rd place, bronze medalist(s)	Daria Shmeleva	Russia	+0.188	
4	Stephanie Morton	Australia	+0.286	
5	Shanne Braspennincx	Netherlands	+0.369	
6	Mathilde Gros	France	+0.432	
