= 2018 UCI Track Cycling World Championships – Women's keirin =

Women's keirin at the 2018 UCI Track Cycling World Championships
- Venue: Omnisport Apeldoorn
- Location: Apeldoorn, Netherlands
- Dates: 4 March
- Competitors: 24

Medalists
gold medal	Nicky Degrendele	Belgium
silver medal	Lee Wai Sze	Hong Kong
bronze medal	Simona Krupeckaitė	Lithuania

The women's keirin competition at the 2018 UCI Track Cycling World Championships was held on 4 March 2018 at the Omnisport Apeldoorn in Apeldoorn, Netherlands.

== Results ==
=== First round ===
The first two riders in each heat qualified to the second round, all other riders advanced to the first round repechages.

Heat 1

Rank	Name	Nation	Gap	Notes
1	Kristina Vogel	Germany		Q
2	Lee Hye-jin	South Korea	+0.252	Q
3	Anastasia Voynova	Russia	+0.385	
4	Sára Kaňkovská	Czech Republic	+0.658	
5	Yuka Kobayashi	Japan	REL	
–	Ma Wing Yu	Hong Kong	DNF	

Heat 3

Rank	Name	Nation	Gap	Notes
1	Lee Wai Sze	Hong Kong		Q
2	Katy Marchant	Great Britain	+0.024	Q
3	Stephanie Morton	Australia	+0.136	
4	Madalyn Godby	United States	+0.155	
5	Emma Cumming	New Zealand	+0.165	
6	Laurine van Riessen	Netherlands	+0.216	

Heat 2

Rank	Name	Nation	Gap	Notes
1	Simona Krupeckaitė	Lithuania		Q
2	Shanne Braspennincx	Netherlands	+0.030	Q
3	Mathilde Gros	France	+0.085	
4	Martha Bayona	Colombia	+0.244	
5	Luz Gaxiola	Mexico	+0.423	
6	Kayono Maeda	Japan	+1.474	

Heat 4

Rank	Name	Nation	Gap	Notes
1	Nicky Degrendele	Belgium		Q
2	Lyubov Shulika	Ukraine	+0.231	Q
3	Natasha Hansen	New Zealand	+0.242	
4	Helena Casas	Spain	+0.350	
5	Miglė Marozaitė	Lithuania	+0.390	
–	Daria Shmeleva	Russia	REL	

=== First round repechage ===
The first rider in each heat qualified to the second round.

Heat 1

Rank	Name	Nation	Gap	Notes
1	Helena Casas	Spain		Q
2	Kayono Maeda	Japan	+0.109	
3	Anastasia Voynova	Russia	+0.161	
4	Emma Cumming	New Zealand	+0.661	

Heat 3

Rank	Name	Nation	Gap	Notes
1	Daria Shmeleva	Russia		Q
2	Martha Bayona	Colombia	+0.050	
3	Stephanie Morton	Australia	+0.103	
4	Yuka Kobayashi	Japan	+0.176	

Heat 2

Rank	Name	Nation	Gap	Notes
1	Luz Gaxiola	Mexico		Q
2	Madalyn Godby	United States	+0.065	
3	Ma Wing Yu	Hong Kong	+ 0.176	
–	Mathilde Gros	France	REL	

Heat 4

Rank	Name	Nation	Gap	Notes
1	Laurine van Riessen	Netherlands		Q
2	Natasha Hansen	New Zealand	+0.095	
3	Sára Kaňkovská	Czech Republic	+0.156	
4	Miglė Marozaitė	Lithuania	+0.207	

=== Second round ===
The first three riders in each heat qualified to final 1–6, all other riders advanced to final 7–12.

Heat 1

Rank	Name	Nation	Gap	Notes
1	Kristina Vogel	Germany		Q
2	Nicky Degrendele	Belgium	+0.148	Q
3	Shanne Braspennincx	Netherlands	+0.164	Q
4	Katy Marchant	Great Britain	+0.214	
5	Helena Casas	Spain	+2.499	
6	Daria Shmeleva	Russia	+3.898	

Heat 2

Rank	Name	Nation	Gap	Notes
1	Laurine van Riessen	Netherlands		Q
2	Simona Krupeckaitė	Lithuania	+0.101	Q
3	Lee Wai Sze	Hong Kong	+0.148	Q
4	Lee Hye-jin	South Korea	+0.192	
5	Lyubov Shulika	Ukraine	+0.339	
6	Luz Gaxiola	Mexico	+0.453	

=== Finals ===
The finals were started at 14:56.

Small final

Rank	Name	Nation	Gap	Notes
7	Lyubov Shulika	Ukraine		
8	Lee Hye-jin	South Korea	+0.154	
9	Katy Marchant	Great Britain	+0.250	
10	Helena Casas	Spain	+0.257	
11	Daria Shmeleva	Russia	+0.267	
12	Luz Gaxiola	Mexico	+0.531	

Final

Rank	Name	Nation	Gap	Notes
1st place, gold medalist(s)	Nicky Degrendele	Belgium		
2nd place, silver medalist(s)	Lee Wai Sze	Hong Kong	+0.086	
3rd place, bronze medalist(s)	Simona Krupeckaitė	Lithuania	+0.150	
4	Laurine van Riessen	Netherlands	+0.171	
5	Shanne Braspennincx	Netherlands	+0.207	
6	Kristina Vogel	Germany	+0.291	
