= Cycling at the 2020 Summer Olympics – Women's sprint =

Olympic cycling event

Women's sprint at the Games of the XXXII Olympiad
- Olympic track cycling
- Venues: Izu Velodrome
- Dates: 6–8 August 2021
- Competitors: 29 from 18 nations

Medalists
1st place, gold medalist(s)		Kelsey Mitchell	Canada
2nd place, silver medalist(s)		Olena Starikova	Ukraine
3rd place, bronze medalist(s)		Lee Wai-sze	Hong Kong

The women's sprint event at the 2020 Summer Olympics took place from 6 to 8 August 2021 at the Izu Velodrome. 30 cyclists from 18 nations competed. Canadian rider Kelsey Mitchell won gold, with Olena Starikova from Ukraine and Lee Wai-sze from Hong-Kong completing the medal positions.

The medals were presented by Yasuhiro Yamashita, IOC member, Olympian, 1 Gold Medal, Japan; and the medalists' bouquets were presented by David Lappartient, President of the UCI, France.

== Background ==
This will be the 9th appearance of the event, which has been held at every Summer Olympics since the introduction of women's track cycling in 1988.

The reigning Olympic champion is Kristina Vogel of Germany. The reigning World Champion is Emma Hinze, also of Germany.

== Qualification ==
A National Olympic Committee (NOC) could enter up to 2 qualified cyclists in the women's sprint. Quota places are allocated to the NOC, which selects the cyclists. Qualification is entirely through the 2018–20 UCI nation rankings. The eight nations that qualify for the team sprint event may enter two cyclists each in the individual sprint (as well as the Keirin). The nations that qualify a cyclist through the Keirin rankings may also enter that cyclist in the sprint. Finally, seven places are allocated through the individual sprint rankings; these places must ensure that each of the five continents are represented. Because qualification was complete by the end of the 2020 UCI Track Cycling World Championships on 1 March 2020 (the last event that contributed to the 2018–20 rankings), qualification was unaffected by the COVID-19 pandemic.

== Competition format ==
For the first time since 2000, the sprint competition format is seeing significant changes. The number of main rounds is increasing from 5 to 6 and the number of repechages from 2 to 3. The competition begins, as usual, with a qualifying round of time trials (flying start 200 metres). The top 24 cyclists in the qualifying round (up from 18) qualify for match rounds. In each match round, the cyclists start side by side and must complete 3 laps of the track (750 metres). The last 200 metres are timed. The match rounds are as follows.

- Round 1 pairs the 24 cyclists into 12 heats; the winner of each advances to round 2 while the loser goes to the first repechage.
- The first repechage places the 12 cyclists into 4 heats of 3 cyclists each; the winner of each heat rejoins the round 1 winners in advancing to round 2 while the remaining cyclists are eliminated.
- Round 2 pairs the 16 cyclists into 8 heats; the winner of each advances to the 1/8 finals while the loser goes to the second repechage.
- The second repechage again has 4 heats, this time of 2 cyclists each; the winner of each rejoins the round 2 winners and advances to the 1/8 finals while the loser of each heat is eliminated.
- The 1/8 finals pairs the 12 cyclists into 6 heats; the winner of each advances to the quarterfinals while the loser goes to the third repechage.
- The third repechage has 2 heats of 3 cyclists each; the winner goes to the quarterfinals while all others are eliminated (the classification 9–12 race has been removed).
- The quarterfinals begins best-two-of-three matches; the 8 cyclists are paired into 4 quarterfinals. The winner of two races in each quarterfinal goes to the semifinals, while the loser is placed in the classification 5–8 race.
- The semifinals again uses best-two-of-three matches, with the 4 cyclists paired into 2 semifinals. The winner of each semifinal goes to the final, the loser goes to the bronze medal match.
- The finals round includes the final, bronze medal match, and classification 5–8 race. The final and bronze medal match are one-on-one, best-two-of-three in format; the classification 5–8 race is a single race of 4 cyclists.

== Schedule ==
All times are Japan Standard Time (UTC+9)

Date	Time	Round
6 August 2021	15:30; 16:16; 16:58; 18:06; 18:53	Qualifying; 1/32 finals 1/32 finals repechages 1/16 finals 1/16 finals repechages
7 August 2021	15:30; 16:13; 16:39	1/8 finals 1/8 finals repechages Quarterfinals
8 August 2021	10:18; 11:06; 11:20	Semifinals; Classification 5–8; Finals

== Results ==
=== Qualifying ===
Rank	Cyclist	Nation	Time	Behind	Notes
1	Lea Friedrich	Germany	10.310		Q, OR
2	Kelsey Mitchell	Canada	10.346	+0.036	Q
3	Emma Hinze	Germany	10.381	+0.071	Q
4	Mathilde Gros	France	10.400	+0.090	Q
5	Lauriane Genest	Canada	10.460	+0.150	Q
6	Olena Starikova	Ukraine	10.461	+0.151	Q
7	Shanne Braspennincx	Netherlands	10.479	+0.169	Q
8	Katy Marchant	Great Britain	10.495	+0.185	Q
9	Lee Wai-sze	Hong Kong	10.538	+0.228	Q
10	Zhong Tianshi	China	10.559	+0.249	Q
11	Ellesse Andrews	New Zealand	10.563	+0.253	Q
12	Daria Shmeleva	ROC	10.667	+0.357	Q
13	Anastasia Voynova	ROC	10.669	+0.359	Q
14	Kaarle McCulloch	Australia	10.679	+0.369	Q
15	Daniela Gaxiola	Mexico	10.682	+0.372	Q
16	Simona Krupeckaitė	Lithuania	10.706	+0.396	Q
17	Yuka Kobayashi	Japan	10.711	+0.401	Q
18	Bao Shanju	China	10.723	+0.413	Q
19	Yuli Verdugo	Mexico	10.818	+0.508	Q
20	Madalyn Godby	United States	10.869	+0.559	Q
21	Lee Hye-jin	South Korea	10.904	+0.594	Q
22	Charlene du Preez	South Africa	10.974	+0.664	Q
23	Lyubov Basova	Ukraine	10.981	+0.671	Q
24	Miglė Marozaitė	Lithuania	11.031	+0.721	Q
25	Urszula Łoś	Poland	11.047	+0.737	
26	Marlena Karwacka	Poland	11.083	+0.773	
27	Kirstie James	New Zealand	11.116	+0.806	
28	Jessica Lee	Hong Kong	11.232	+0.922	
29	Coralie Demay	France	11.849	+1.539	
	Laurine van Riessen	Netherlands	Did not start		

=== 1/32 finals ===
Heat	Rank	Cyclist	Nation	Gap	Notes
1	1	Lea Friedrich	Germany	X	Q
1	2	Miglė Marozaitė	Lithuania	+0.370	R
2	1	Kelsey Mitchell	Canada	X	Q
2	2	Lyubov Basova	Ukraine	+0.535	R
3	1	Emma Hinze	Germany	X	Q
3	2	Charlene du Preez	South Africa	+0.415	R
4	1	Mathilde Gros	France	X	Q
4	2	Lee Hye-jin	South Korea	+0.797	R
5	1	Lauriane Genest	Canada	X	Q
5	2	Madalyn Godby	United States	+0.121	R
6	1	Olena Starikova	Ukraine	X	Q
6	2	Yuli Verdugo	Mexico	+0.107	R
7	1	Shanne Braspennincx	Netherlands	X	Q
7	2	Bao Shanju	China	+0.152	R
8	1	Katy Marchant	Great Britain	X	Q
8	2	Yuka Kobayashi	Japan	+0.612	R
9	1	Lee Wai-sze	Hong Kong	X	Q
9	2	Simona Krupeckaitė	Lithuania	+0.102	R
10	1	Zhong Tianshi	China	X	Q
10	2	Daniela Gaxiola	Mexico	+0.087	R
11	1	Ellesse Andrews	New Zealand	X	Q
11	2	Kaarle McCulloch	Australia	+0.255	R
12	1	Anastasia Voynova	ROC	X	Q
12	2	Daria Shmeleva	ROC	+0.056	R

=== 1/32 finals repechages ===
Heat	Rank	Cyclist	Nation	Gap	Notes
1	1	Yuka Kobayashi	Japan	X	Q
1	2	Simona Krupeckaitė	Lithuania	+0.052	
1	3	Miglė Marozaitė	Lithuania	+0.265	
2	1	Bao Shanju	China	X	Q
2	2	Daniela Gaxiola	Mexico	+0.027	
2	3	Lyubov Basova	Ukraine	+0.602	
3	1	Kaarle McCulloch	Australia	X	Q
3	2	Yuli Verdugo	Mexico	+0.041	
3	3	Charlene du Preez	South Africa	+0.354	
4	1	Madalyn Godby	United States	X	Q
4	2	Lee Hye-jin	South Korea	+0.054	
4	3	Daria Shmeleva	ROC	+0.057	

=== 1/16 finals ===
Heat	Rank	Cyclist	Nation	Gap	Notes
1	1	Lea Friedrich	Germany	X	Q
1	2	Madalyn Godby	United States	+0.391	R
2	1	Kelsey Mitchell	Canada	X	Q
2	2	Kaarle McCulloch	Australia	+0.135	R
3	1	Emma Hinze	Germany	X	Q
3	2	Bao Shanju	China	+0.201	R
4	1	Mathilde Gros	France	X	Q
4	2	Yuka Kobayashi	Japan	+0.485	R
5	1	Lauriane Genest	Canada	X	Q
5	2	Anastasia Voynova	ROC	+0.035	R
6	1	Olena Starikova	Ukraine	X	Q
6	2	Ellesse Andrews	New Zealand	+0.026	R
7	1	Shanne Braspennincx	Netherlands	X	Q
7	2	Zhong Tianshi	China	+0.030	R
8	1	Katy Marchant	Great Britain	X	Q
8	2	Lee Wai-sze	Hong Kong	+0.025	R

=== 1/16 finals repechages ===
Heat	Rank	Cyclist	Nation	Gap	Notes
1	1	Lee Wai-sze	Hong Kong	X	Q
1	2	Madalyn Godby	United States	+0.168	
2	1	Zhong Tianshi	China	X	Q
2	2	Kaarle McCulloch	Australia	+0.117	
3	1	Ellesse Andrews	New Zealand	X	Q
3	2	Bao Shanju	China	+0.234	
4	1	Anastasia Voynova	ROC	X	Q
4	2	Yuka Kobayashi	Japan	+0.275	

=== 1/8 finals ===
Heat	Rank	Cyclist	Nation	Gap	Notes
1	1	Lea Friedrich	Germany	X	Q
1	2	Anastasia Voynova	ROC	+0.135	R
2	1	Kelsey Mitchell	Canada	X	Q
2	2	Ellesse Andrews	New Zealand	+0.005	R
3	1	Emma Hinze	Germany	X	Q
3	2	Zhong Tianshi	China	+0.359	R
4	1	Lee Wai-sze	Hong Kong	X	Q
4	2	Mathilde Gros	France	+0.019	R
5	1	Katy Marchant	Great Britain	X	Q
5	2	Lauriane Genest	Canada	+0.179	R
6	1	Shanne Braspennincx	Netherlands	X	Q
6	2	Olena Starikova	Ukraine	+0.045	R

=== 1/8 finals repechages ===
Heat	Rank	Cyclist	Nation	Gap	Notes
1	1	Lauriane Genest	Canada	X	Q
1	2	Mathilde Gros	France	+0.001	
1	3	Anastasia Voynova	ROC	+0.095	
2	1	Olena Starikova	Ukraine	X	Q
2	2	Ellesse Andrews	New Zealand	+0.007	
2	3	Zhong Tianshi	China	+0.056	

=== Quarterfinals ===
Heat	Rank	Cyclist	Nation	Race 1	Race 2	Decider (i.r.)	Notes
1	1	Olena Starikova	Ukraine	X	+0.018	X	SF
1	2	Lea Friedrich	Germany	+0.001	X	+0.019	F5-8
2	1	Kelsey Mitchell	Canada	X	X		SF
2	2	Lauriane Genest	Canada	+0.041	+0.058		F5-8
3	1	Emma Hinze	Germany	X	X		SF
3	2	Shanne Braspennincx	Netherlands	+0.098	+0.074		F5-8
4	1	Lee Wai-sze	Hong Kong	X	X		SF
4	2	Katy Marchant	Great Britain	+0.027	+0.036		F5-8

=== Classification 5–8 ===
Rank	Cyclist	Nation	Gap
5	Lea Friedrich	Germany	
6	Katy Marchant	Great Britain	+0.099
7	Shanne Braspennincx	Netherlands	+0.126
8	Lauriane Genest	Canada	+0.216

=== Semifinals ===
Heat	Rank	Cyclist	Nation	Race 1	Race 2	Decider (i.r.)	Notes
1	1	Olena Starikova	Ukraine	X	X		QG
1	2	Lee Wai-sze	Hong Kong	+0.040	+0.128		QB
2	1	Kelsey Mitchell	Canada	X	+0.285	X	QG
2	2	Emma Hinze	Germany	+0.101	X	+0.176	QB

=== Finals ===
Rank	Cyclist	Nation	Race 1	Race 2	Decider (i.r.)
Gold medal final
1st place, gold medalist(s)	Kelsey Mitchell	Canada	X	X	
2nd place, silver medalist(s)	Olena Starikova	Ukraine	+0.061	+0.064	
Bronze medal final
3rd place, bronze medalist(s)	Lee Wai-sze	Hong Kong	X	X	
4	Emma Hinze	Germany	+0.964	+0.233	
