= Cycling at the 2020 Summer Olympics – Women's keirin =

Olympic cycling event

Women's Keirin at the Games of the XXXII Olympiad
- Olympic track cycling
- Venues: Izu Velodrome
- Dates: 4–5 August 2021
- Competitors: 29 from 18 nations

Medalists
1st place, gold medalist(s)		Shanne Braspennincx	Netherlands
2nd place, silver medalist(s)		Ellesse Andrews	New Zealand
3rd place, bronze medalist(s)		Lauriane Genest	Canada

The women's Keirin event at the 2020 Summer Olympics took place on 4 and 5 August 2021 at the Izu Velodrome. 29 cyclists from 18 nations competed.

== Background ==
This will be the 3rd appearance of the event, which has been held at every Summer Olympics since its introduction in 2012.

The reigning Olympic champion is Elis Ligtlee of the Netherlands. The reigning (2020) World Champion is Emma Hinze of Germany.

Russia, Germany, China, Great Britain, Australia, and the Netherlands are traditionally strong track cycling nations.

== Qualification ==
A National Olympic Committee (NOC) could enter up to 2 qualified cyclists in the women's Keirin. Quota places are allocated to the NOC, which selects the cyclists. Qualification is entirely through the 2018–20 UCI nation rankings. The eight nations that qualify for the team sprint event may enter two cyclists each in the Keirin (as well as the individual sprint). The nations that qualify a cyclist through the individual sprint rankings may also enter that cyclist in the Keirin. Finally, seven places are allocated through the Keirin rankings. Because qualification was complete by the end of the 2020 UCI Track Cycling World Championships on 1 March 2020 (the last event that contributed to the 2018–20 rankings), qualification was unaffected by the COVID-19 pandemic.

== Competition format ==
Keirin races involve up to seven cyclists each, though the 2020 format has no races with more than six.

The cyclists follow a pace motorcycle for three laps (750 m) before the motorcycle pulls away and the cyclists race for another three laps.

These distances are changed from the 2016 Games, shortening the paced section from 5½ laps and lengthening the unpaced sprint from 2½ laps. The motorcycle starts at 30 km/h and increases speed to 50 km/h before it pulls away.

The tournament consists of four main rounds, up from three in 2016, and a repechage:

- First round: Four heats of six cyclists and one of five, with the top two in each heat (10 total) advancing to the second round; all others (19 cyclists) go to the repechage.
- Repechage: Three heats of five cyclists and one of four, with the top two in each heat (8 total) rejoining the first-round winners in the second round; the remaining 11 cyclists are eliminated.
- Second round: Three heats of six cyclists each. The top four cyclists in each heat (12 total) advance to the semifinals; the remaining six cyclists are eliminated.
- Semifinals: Two heats of six cyclists each; the top three in each semifinal (six total) advance to Final A and medal contention; the bottom three cyclists from each semifinal go to Final B.
- Finals: Two finals. Final A consists of the top six cyclists, awarding medals and 4th through 6th place. Final B ranks the next six cyclists from 7th to 12th place.

== Schedule ==
All times are Japan Standard Time (UTC+9)

Date	Time	Round
4 August 2021	16:10; 17:11	First round Repechages
5 August 2021	16:06; 16:57; 17:37	Quarterfinals; Semifinals; Finals

== Results ==
=== First round ===
Heat 1

Rank	Cyclist	Nation	Gap	Notes
1	Laurine van Riessen	Netherlands		QF
2	Zhong Tianshi	China	+0.174	QF
3	Lee Hye-jin	South Korea	+0.371	R
4	Jessica Lee	Hong Kong	+0.445	R
5	Katy Marchant	Great Britain	REL	R

Heat 2

Rank	Cyclist	Nation	Gap	Notes
1	Lea Friedrich	Germany		QF
2	Daria Shmeleva	ROC	+0.102	QF
3	Lee Wai-sze	Hong Kong	+0.188	R
4	Charlene du Preez	South Africa	+0.309	R
5	Coralie Demay	France	+0.425	R
6	Miglė Marozaitė	Lithuania	+1.364	R

Heat 3

Rank	Cyclist	Nation	Gap	Notes
1	Kelsey Mitchell	Canada		QF
2	Daniela Gaxiola	Mexico	+0.100	QF
3	Anastasia Voynova	ROC	+0.119	R
4	Bao Shanju	China	+0.206	R
5	Emma Hinze	Germany	+0.310	R
6	Lyubov Basova	Ukraine	+0.554	R

Heat 4

Rank	Cyclist	Nation	Gap	Notes
1	Olena Starikova	Ukraine		QF
2	Yuka Kobayashi	Japan	+0.070	QF
3	Shanne Braspennincx	Netherlands	+0.105	R
4	Ellesse Andrews	New Zealand	+0.182	R
5	Marlena Karwacka	Poland	+0.400	R
6	Simona Krupeckaitė	Lithuania	+1.093	R

Heat 5

Rank	Cyclist	Nation	Gap	Notes
1	Lauriane Genest	Canada		QF
2	Madalyn Godby	United States	+0.075	QF
3	Urszula Łoś	Poland	+0.159	R
4	Kaarle McCulloch	Australia	+0.365	R
5	Yuli Verdugo	Mexico	+0.440	R
6	Mathilde Gros	France	+1.126	R

=== Repechages ===
Heat 1

Rank	Cyclist	Nation	Gap	Notes
1	Ellesse Andrews	New Zealand		QF
2	Lyubov Basova	Ukraine	+0.074	QF
3	Lee Hye-jin	South Korea	+0.133	
4	Jessica Lee	Hong Kong	+1.005	
5	Miglė Marozaitė	Lithuania	+1.241	

Heat 2

Rank	Cyclist	Nation	Gap	Notes
1	Lee Wai-sze	Hong Kong		QF
2	Kaarle McCulloch	Australia	+0.146	QF
3	Simona Krupeckaitė	Lithuania	+0.554	
4	Yuli Verdugo	Mexico	+0.601	
5	Bao Shanju	China	+0.620	

Heat 3

Rank	Cyclist	Nation	Gap	Notes
1	Katy Marchant	Great Britain		QF
2	Mathilde Gros	France	+0.137	QF
3	Anastasia Voynova	ROC	+0.143	
4	Marlena Karwacka	Poland	+0.243	
5	Charlene du Preez	South Africa	+0.351	

Heat 4

Rank	Cyclist	Nation	Gap	Notes
1	Shanne Braspennincx	Netherlands		QF
2	Emma Hinze	Germany	+0.005	QF
3	Urszula Łoś	Poland	+0.119	
4	Coralie Demay	France	+0.603	

=== Quarterfinals ===
Heat 1

Rank	Cyclist	Nation	Gap	Notes
1	Lee Wai-sze	Hong Kong		SF
2	Olena Starikova	Ukraine	+0.029	SF
3	Daria Shmeleva	ROC	+0.086	SF
4	Emma Hinze	Germany	+0.490	SF
5	Katy Marchant	Great Britain	+41.527	
6	Laurine van Riessen	Netherlands	DNF	

Heat 2

Rank	Cyclist	Nation	Gap	Notes
1	Shanne Braspennincx	Netherlands		SF
2	Ellesse Andrews	New Zealand	+0.052	SF
3	Daniela Gaxiola	Mexico	+0.084	SF
4	Lauriane Genest	Canada	+0.094	SF
5	Mathilde Gros	France	+0.312	
6	Lea Friedrich	Germany	+0.313	

Heat 3

Rank	Cyclist	Nation	Gap	Notes
1	Kelsey Mitchell	Canada		SF
2	Kaarle McCulloch	Australia	+0.136	SF
3	Zhong Tianshi	China	+0.152	SF
4	Lyubov Basova	Ukraine	+0.354	SF
5	Madalyn Godby	United States	+0.434	
6	Yuka Kobayashi	Japan	+0.447	

=== Semifinals ===
Heat 1

Rank	Cyclist	Nation	Gap	Notes
1	Olena Starikova	Ukraine		FA
2	Ellesse Andrews	New Zealand	+0.017	FA
3	Lyubov Basova	Ukraine	+0.071	FA
4	Daniela Gaxiola	Mexico	+0.097	FB
5	Lee Wai-sze	Hong Kong	+0.153	FB
6	Zhong Tianshi	China	+0.322	FB

Heat 2

Rank	Cyclist	Nation	Gap	Notes
1	Shanne Braspennincx	Netherlands		FA
2	Kelsey Mitchell	Canada	+0.277	FA
3	Lauriane Genest	Canada	+0.315	FA
4	Daria Shmeleva	ROC	+0.320	FB
5	Kaarle McCulloch	Australia	+0.400	FB
6	Emma Hinze	Germany	+0.814	FB

=== Finals ===
==== Final B ====
Rank	Cyclist	Nation	Gap	Notes
7	Emma Hinze	Germany		
8	Lee Wai-sze	Hong Kong	+0.043	
9	Kaarle McCulloch	Australia	+0.097	
10	Daria Shmeleva	ROC	+0.163	
11	Daniela Gaxiola	Mexico	+0.617	
12	Zhong Tianshi	China	+0.729	

==== Final A ====
Rank	Cyclist	Nation	Gap	Notes
1st place, gold medalist(s)	Shanne Braspennincx	Netherlands		
2nd place, silver medalist(s)	Ellesse Andrews	New Zealand	+0.061	
3rd place, bronze medalist(s)	Lauriane Genest	Canada	+0.148	
4	Olena Starikova	Ukraine	+0.396	
5	Kelsey Mitchell	Canada	+0.566	
6	Lyubov Basova	Ukraine	+0.580	

== See also ==
- Keirin
- Cycling at the 2020 Summer Olympics
- Cycling at the 2020 Summer Olympics – Men's keirin
- Cycling at the 2020 Summer Olympics – Women's BMX racing
