= 2013 UCI Track Cycling World Championships – Women's 500 m time trial =

Rainbow jersey

The Women's Time Trial at the 2013 UCI Track Cycling World Championships was held on February 21. 12 athletes participated in the contest.

== Medalists ==
Gold	Lee Wai Sze (HKG)
Silver	Miriam Welte (GER)
Bronze	Becky James (GBR)

== Results ==
The race was held at 19:00.

Rank	Name	Nation	Time	Notes
1st place, gold medalist(s)	Lee Wai Sze	Hong Kong	33.973	
2nd place, silver medalist(s)	Miriam Welte	Germany	33.996	
3rd place, bronze medalist(s)	Becky James	Great Britain	34.133	
4	Lisandra Guerra	Cuba	34.220	
5	Anastasiya Voynova	Russia	34.359	
6	Kaarle McCulloch	Australia	34.362	
7	Tania Calvo Barbero	Spain	34.389	
8	Sandie Clair	France	34.709	
9	Yelena Brezhniva	Russia	34.932	
10	Daria Shmeleva	Russia	35.303	
11	Victoria Williamson	Great Britain	35.409	
12	Kayono Maeda	Japan	35.495	
