= Lithuania at the 2020 Summer Olympics =

- IOC code: LTU
- NOC: Lithuanian National Olympic Committee
- Website: www.ltok.lt (in Lithuanian and English)

in Tokyo, Japan 23 July 2021 – 8 August 2021
- Competitors: 42 in 12 sports
- Flag bearers (opening): Giedrius Titenis; Sandra Jablonskytė
- Flag bearer (closing): Justinas Kinderis
- Medals Ranked 77th: Gold 0 Silver 1 Bronze 0 Total 1

Summer Olympics appearances (overview)
- 1924; 1928; 1932–1988; 1992; 1996; 2000; 2004; 2008; 2012; 2016; 2020; 2024

Other related appearances
- Russian Empire (1908–1912); Soviet Union (1952–1988)

Lithuania competed at the 2020 Summer Olympics in Tokyo. Originally scheduled to take place from 24 July to 9 August 2020, the Games were postponed to 23 July to 8 August 2021, because of the COVID-19 pandemic. It was the nation's eighth consecutive appearance at the Games in the post-Soviet era and tenth overall in Summer Olympic history.

After winning four medals in 2016, Lithuania's medal haul fell to a single silver medal in Tokyo, marking its weakest performance since 1996.

== Medalists ==
Medal	Name	Sport	Event	Date
Silver	Laura Asadauskaitė	Modern pentathlon	Women's individual	6 August

== Competitors ==
The following is the list of number of competitors in the Games.

Sport	Men	Women	Total
Athletics	6	5	11
Canoeing	1	0	1
Cycling	1	4	5
Judo	0	1	1
Gymnastics	1	0	1
Modern pentathlon	1	2	3
Rowing	7	2	9
Sailing	1	1	2
Shooting	1	0	1
Swimming	5	1	6
Weightlifting	1	0	1
Wrestling	1	0	1
Total	26	16	42

== Athletics ==
Lithuanian athletes achieved the entry standards, either by qualifying time or by world ranking, in the following track and field events (up to a maximum of 3 athletes in each event):

Key

- Note–Ranks given for track events are within the athlete's heat only
- Q = Qualified for the next round
- q = Qualified for the next round as a fastest loser or, in field events, by position without achieving the qualifying target
- NR = National record
- N/A = Round not applicable for the event
- Bye = Athlete not required to compete in round

Track & road events

Athlete	Event	Heat		Semifinal		Final	
Athlete	Event	Result	Rank	Result	Rank	Result	Rank
Gediminas Truskauskas	Men's 200 m	21.02	5	Did not advance			
Marius Žiūkas	Men's 20 km walk	—N/a				1:27:35	33
Arturas Mastianica	Men's 50 km walk	—N/a				4:06:43	31
Agnė Šerkšnienė	Women's 400 m	52.78	6	Did not advance			
Brigita Virbalytė	Women's 20 km walk	—N/a				1:35:56	26

Field events

Athlete	Event	Qualification		Final	
Athlete	Event	Distance	Position	Distance	Position
Adrijus Glebauskas	Men's high jump	2.17	=26	Did not advance	
Andrius Gudžius	Men's discus throw	65.94	2 q	64.11	6
Edis Matusevičius	Men's javelin throw	81.24	14	Did not advance	
Diana Zagainova	Women's triple jump	13.10	28	Did not advance	
Airinė Palšytė	Women's high jump	1.86	=27	Did not advance	
Liveta Jasiūnaitė	Women's javelin throw	61.96	8 q	60.06	7

== Canoeing ==
=== Sprint ===
Lithuania qualified a single boat (men's K-1 200 m) by winning the gold medal at the 2021 ICF Canoe Sprint World Cup 2 in Barnaul, Russia.

Athlete	Event	Heat		Quarterfinals		Semifinals		Final	
Athlete	Event	Time	Rank	Time	Rank	Time	Rank	Time	Rank
Mindaugas Maldonis	Men's K-1 200 m	35.650	3 QF	35.466	1 SF	36.637	8 FB	36.257	10

Qualification Legend: FA = Qualify to final (medal); FB = Qualify to final B (non-medal)

== Cycling ==
=== Road ===
Lithuania entered one rider to compete in both the men's and women's Olympic road races, due to a top 50 team finish (for men) and top 100 individual finish (for women), respectively, in the UCI World Ranking.

Athlete	Event	Time	Rank
Evaldas Šiškevičius	Men's road race	Did not finish	
Rasa Leleivytė	Women's road race	3:59.47	35

=== Track ===
Following the completion of the 2020 UCI Track Cycling World Championships, Lithuanian riders accumulated spots in the women's team sprint, as well as the women's sprint and keirin, based on their country's results in the final UCI Olympic rankings.

Sprint

Athlete	Event	Qualification		Round 1	Repechage 1	Round 2	Repechage 2	Round 3	Repechage 3	Quarterfinals	Semifinals	Final	
Athlete	Event	Time Speed (km/h)	Rank	Opposition Time Speed (km/h)	Opposition Time Speed (km/h)	Opposition Time Speed (km/h)	Opposition Time Speed (km/h)	Opposition Time Speed (km/h)	Opposition Time Speed (km/h)	Opposition Time Speed (km/h)	Opposition Time Speed (km/h)	Opposition Time Speed (km/h)	Rank
Simona Krupeckaitė	Women's sprint	10.706	16 Q	Lee W-s (HKG); L	Kobayashi (JPN); Marozaitė (LTU); L	Did not advance							
Miglė Marozaitė	Women's sprint	11.031	24 Q	Friedrich (GER); L	Kobayashi (JPN); Krupeckaitė (LTU); L	Did not advance							

Team sprint

Athlete	Event	Qualification		Semifinals		Final	
Athlete	Event	Time Speed (km/h)	Rank	Opposition Time Speed (km/h)	Rank	Opposition Time Speed (km/h)	Rank
Simona Krupeckaitė; Miglė Marozaitė	Women's team sprint	33.276	7	China; L 32.827; 54.833	6	Mexico; W 32.808; 54.865	5

Qualification legend: FA=Gold medal final; FB=Bronze medal final

Keirin

Athlete	Event	1st Round	Repechage	Quarterfinals	Semifinals	Final
Athlete	Event	Rank	Rank	Rank	Rank	Rank
Simona Krupeckaitė	Women's keirin	6 R	3	Did not advance		
Miglė Marozaitė	Women's keirin	6 R	5	Did not advance		

Omnium

Athlete	Event	Scratch race		Tempo race		Elimination race		Points race		Total points	Rank
Athlete	Event	Rank	Points	Rank	Points	Rank	Points	Points	Rank	Total points	Rank
Olivija Baleišytė	Women's omnium	=13	16	17	8	6	30	−20	17	34	17

== Gymnastics ==
=== Artistic ===
Lithuania qualified one male artistic gymnast. Rio 2016 Olympian Robert Tvorogal qualified by finishing sixth out of the twelve gymnasts eligible for qualification at the 2019 World Championships in Stuttgart, Germany.

Men

Athlete	Event	Qualification								Final							
Athlete	Event	Apparatus						Total	Rank	Apparatus						Total	Rank
Athlete	Event	F	PH	R	V	PB	HB	Total	Rank	F	PH	R	V	PB	HB	Total	Rank
Robert Tvorogal	All-around	13.633	12.100	13.300	13.666	14.500	12.766	80.232	46	Did not advance							

== Judo ==
Lithuania entered one judoka into the Olympic tournament based on the International Judo Federation Olympics Individual Ranking.

Athlete	Event	Round of 32	Round of 16	Quarterfinals	Semifinals	Repechage	Final / BM	
Athlete	Event	Opposition Result	Opposition Result	Opposition Result	Opposition Result	Opposition Result	Opposition Result	Rank
Sandra Jablonskytė	Women's +78 kg	Maranić (CRO); W 01–00	Dicko (FRA); L 00–01	Did not advance				

== Modern pentathlon ==
Lithuanian athletes qualified for the following spots in the modern pentathlon at the Games. London 2012 champion Laura Asadauskaitė secured an outright berth in the women's event by winning the gold medal at the 2019 UIPM World Cup Final in Tokyo, Japan. Justinas Kinderis and London 2012 Olympian Gintarė Venčkauskaitė confirmed places in their respective events, with the former finishing sixth and the latter fifth among those eligible for Olympic qualification at the 2019 European Championships in Bath, England.

Athlete	Event	Fencing (épée one touch)				Swimming (200 m freestyle)			Riding (show jumping)			Combined: shooting/running (10 m air pistol)/(3200 m)			Total points	Final rank
Athlete	Event	RR	BR	Rank	MP points	Time	Rank	MP points	Time	Rank	MP points	Time	Rank	MP points	Total points	Final rank
Justinas Kinderis	Men's	24–11	2	3	246	2:02.84	18	305	99.13	31	247	11:22.82	18	618	1416	18
Laura Asadauskaitė	Women's	15–20	2	25	192	2:17.21	25	276	77.09	=1	300	11:38.37	1	602	1370	2nd place, silver medalist(s)
Gintarė Venčkauskaitė	Women's	12–23	1	34	173	2:18.37	30	274	72.74	=1	300	11:44.37	2	596	1343	7

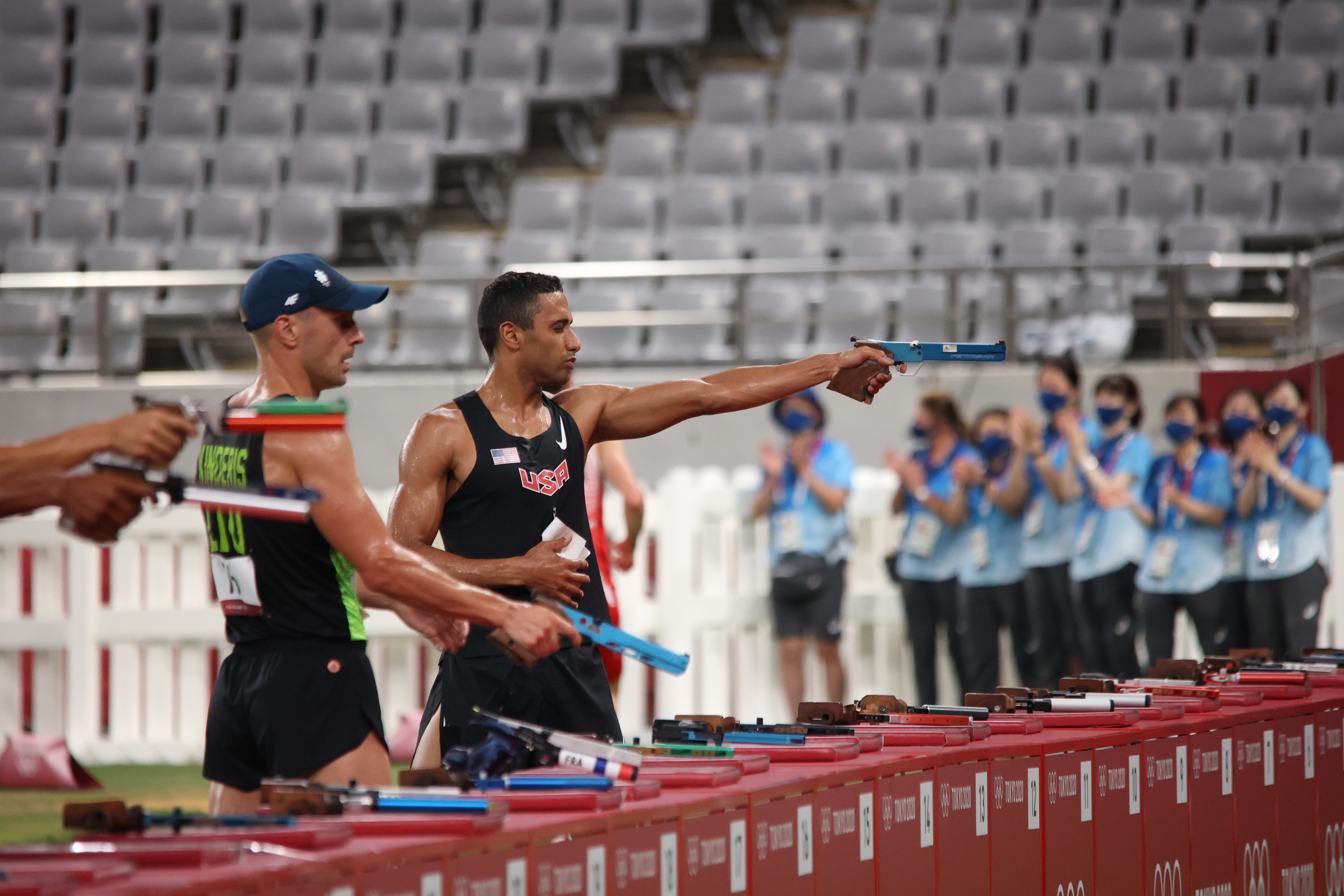
Justinas Kidneris shooting

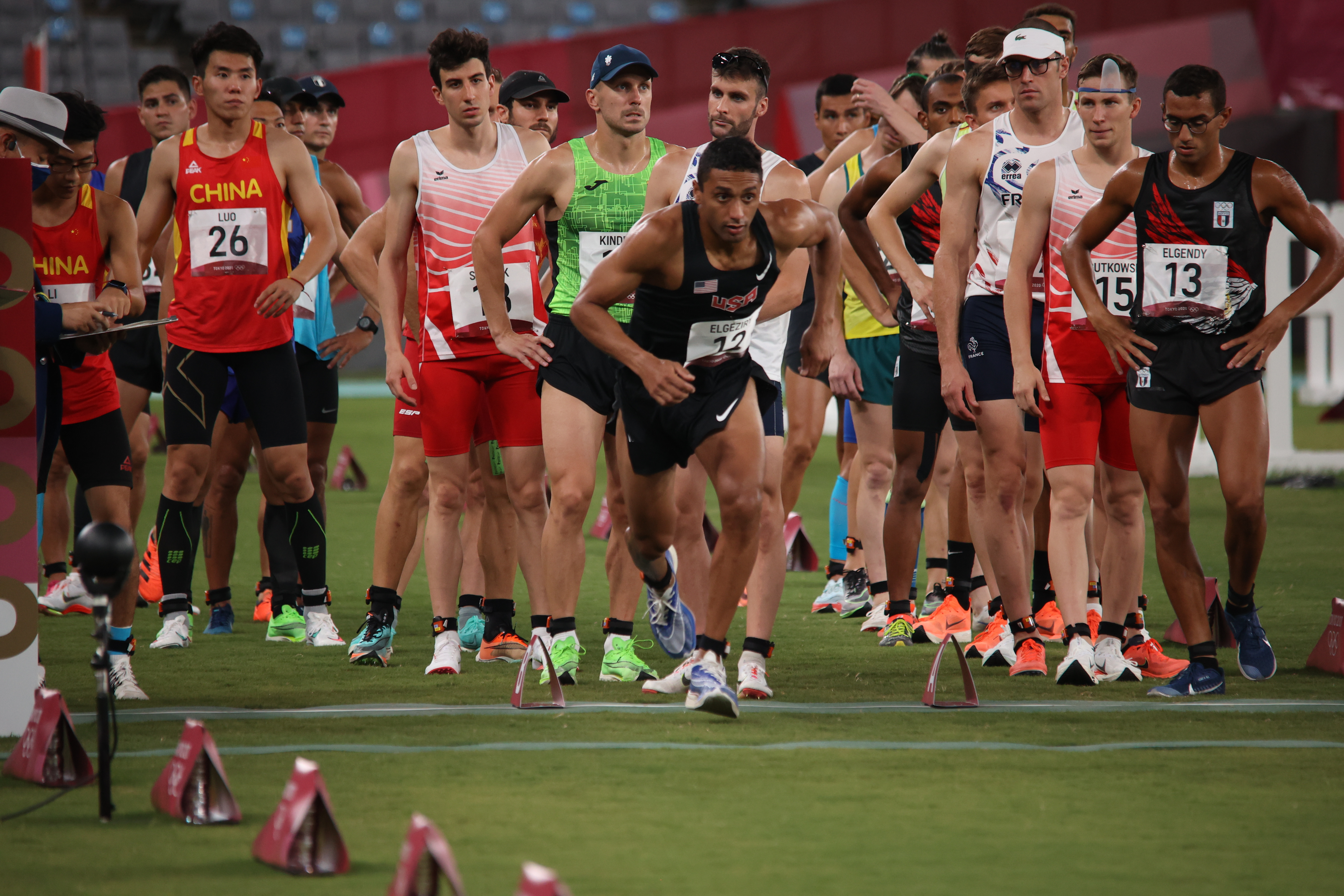
Justinas Kinderis at the start of combined event

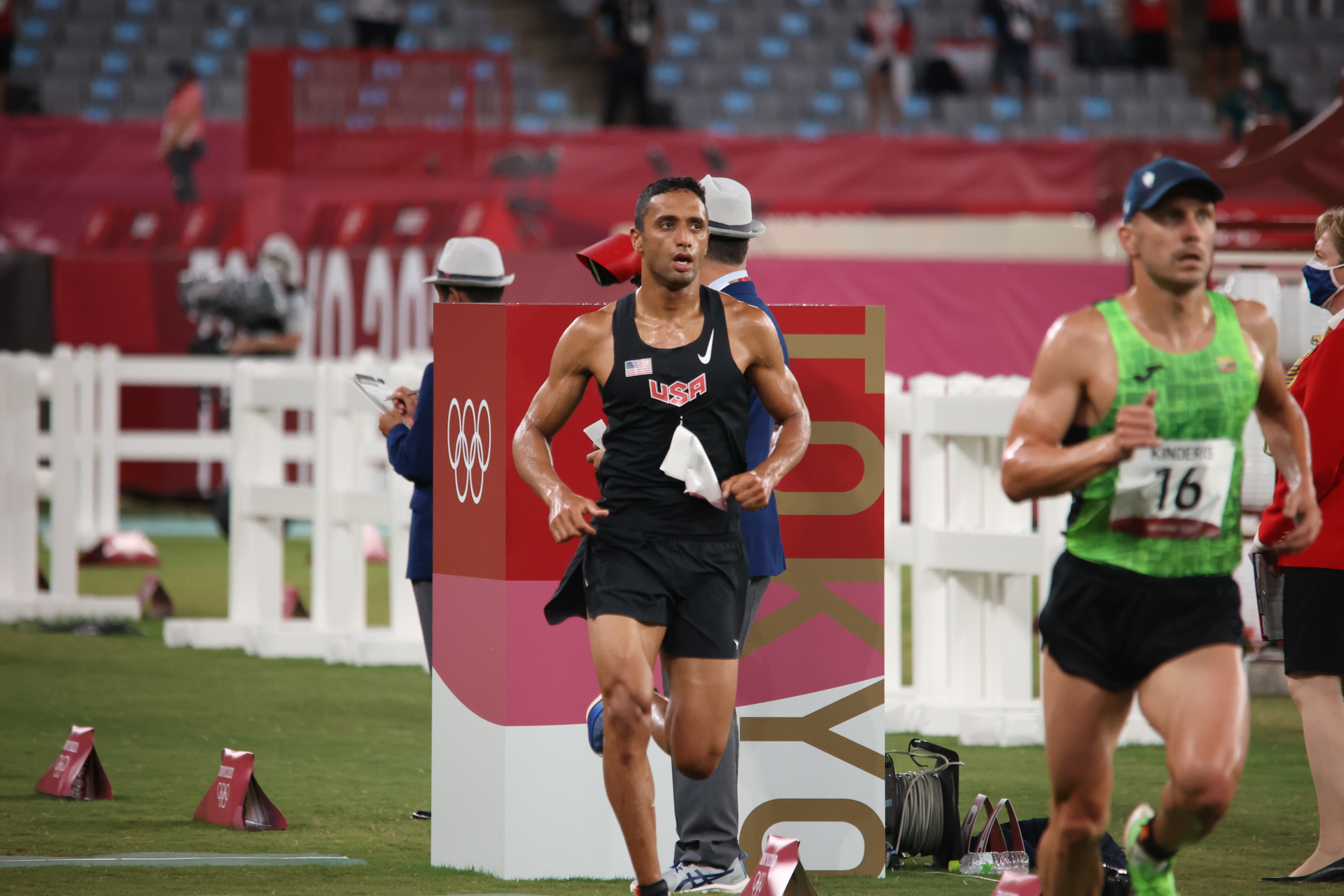
Justinas Kinderis running

== Rowing ==
Lithuania qualified a total of four boats (three men's and one women's) for each of the following rowing events, three of them were gained at the 2019 FISA World Championships in Ottensheim, Austria, and the men's quadruple crew qualified through a final qualification regatta in Lucerne, Switzerland due to Russian crew declining their spot.

Athlete	Event	Heats		Repechage		Quarterfinals		Semifinals		Final	
Athlete	Event	Time	Rank	Time	Rank	Time	Rank	Time	Rank	Time	Rank
Mindaugas Griškonis	Men's single sculls	7:05.88	2 QF	Bye		7:16.71	3 SA/B	6:45.90	3 FA	6:57.60	6
Aurimas Adomavičius; Saulius Ritter	Men's double sculls	6:23.08	4 R	6:27.36	2 SA/B	—N/a		6:34.04	6 FB	6:20.87	12
Donata Karalienė; Milda Valčiukaitė	Women's double sculls	6:50.38	2 SA/B	Bye		—N/a		7:11.29	3 FA	6:47.44	4
Dominykas Jančionis; Dovydas Nemeravičius; Armandas Kelmelis; Martynas Džiaugys	Men's quadruple sculls	6:03.07	5 R	6:14.73	6 FB	—N/a				5:51.64	10

Qualification Legend: FA=Final A (medal); FB=Final B (non-medal); FC=Final C (non-medal); FD=Final D (non-medal); FE=Final E (non-medal); FF=Final F (non-medal); SA/B=Semifinals A/B; SC/D=Semifinals C/D; SE/F=Semifinals E/F; QF=Quarterfinals; R=Repechage

== Sailing ==
Lithuanian sailors qualified one boat in each of the following classes through the class-associated World Championships, and the continental regattas.

Athlete	Event	Race													Net points	Final rank
Athlete	Event	1	2	3	4	5	6	7	8	9	10	11	12	M*	Net points	Final rank
Juozas Bernotas	Men's RS:X	23	11	12	15	~~26~~	10	12	18	13	12	14	5	EL	145	15
Viktorija Andrulytė	Women's Laser Radial	~~38~~	10	29	24	26	19	23	27	33	3	—N/a		EL	194	25

M = Medal race; EL = Eliminated – did not advance into the medal race

== Shooting ==
Lithuanian shooters achieved quota places for the following events by virtue of their best finishes at the 2018 ISSF World Championships, the 2019 ISSF World Cup series, European Championships or Games, and European Qualifying Tournament, as long as they obtained a minimum qualifying score (MQS) by 5 June 2021.

Athlete	Event	Qualification		Final	
Athlete	Event	Points	Rank	Points	Rank
Karolis Girulis	Men's 10 m air rifle	624.3	28	Did not advance	
Karolis Girulis	Men's 50 m rifle 3 positions	1163	25	Did not advance	

== Swimming ==
Lithuanian swimmers further achieved qualifying standards in the following events (up to a maximum of 2 swimmers in each event at the Olympic Qualifying Time (OQT), and potentially 1 at the Olympic Selection Time (OST)):

Athlete	Event	Heat		Semifinal		Final	
Athlete	Event	Time	Rank	Time	Rank	Time	Rank
Danas Rapšys	Men's 200 m freestyle	1:45.84	9 Q	1:45.32	3 Q	1:45.78	8
Danas Rapšys	Men's 400 m freestyle	3:46.32	13	—N/a		Did not advance	
Danas Rapšys	Men's 200 m individual medley	1:59.90	33	Did not advance			
Andrius Šidlauskas	Men's 100 m breaststroke	59.46	13 Q	59.82	=13	Did not advance	
Andrius Šidlauskas	Men's 200 m breaststroke	2:09.56	13 Q	2:10.69	16	Did not advance	
Giedrius Titenis	Men's 100 m breaststroke	1:00.92	36	Did not advance			
Simonas Bilis; Deividas Margevičius; Danas Rapšys; Andrius Šidlauskas	Men's 4 × 100 m medley relay	DSQ		—N/a		Did not advance	
Kotryna Teterevkova	Women's 100 m breaststroke	1:06.82	15 Q	1:07.39	14	Did not advance	
Kotryna Teterevkova	Women's 200 m breaststroke	2:26.82	23	Did not advance			

== Weightlifting ==
Lithuania entered one male weightlifter into the Olympic competition. Arnas Šidiškis accepted a spare berth unused by Europe as the next highest-ranked weightlifter vying for qualification in the men's 109 kg category based on the IWF Absolute World Rankings.

Athlete	Event	Snatch		Clean & Jerk		Total	Rank
Athlete	Event	Result	Rank	Result	Rank	Total	Rank
Arnas Šidiškis	Men's −109 kg	156	13	187	11	343	11

== Wrestling ==
Lithuania qualified one wrestler for the men's Greco-Roman 130 kg into the Olympic competition, by progressing to the top two finals at the 2021 European Qualification Tournament in Budapest, Hungary.

Key:

- VT (ranking points: 5–0 or 0–5) – Victory by fall.
- VB (ranking points: 5–0 or 0–5) – Victory by injury (VF for forfeit, VA for withdrawal or disqualification)
- PP (ranking points: 3–1 or 1–3) – Decision by points – the loser with technical points.
- PO (ranking points: 3–0 or 0–3) – Decision by points – the loser without technical points.
- ST (ranking points: 4–0 or 0–4) – Great superiority – the loser without technical points and a margin of victory of at least 8 (Greco-Roman) or 10 (freestyle) points.
- SP (ranking points: 4–1 or 1–4) – Technical superiority – the loser with technical points and a margin of victory of at least 8 (Greco-Roman) or 10 (freestyle) points.

Greco-Roman

Athlete	Event	Round of 16	Quarterfinal	Semifinal	Repechage	Final / BM	
Athlete	Event	Opposition Result	Opposition Result	Opposition Result	Opposition Result	Opposition Result	Rank
Mantas Knystautas	Men's −130 kg	Kayaalp (TUR); L 1–3 ^{PP}	Did not advance				10
