= Jessica Lee (cyclist) =

Hong Kong cyclist

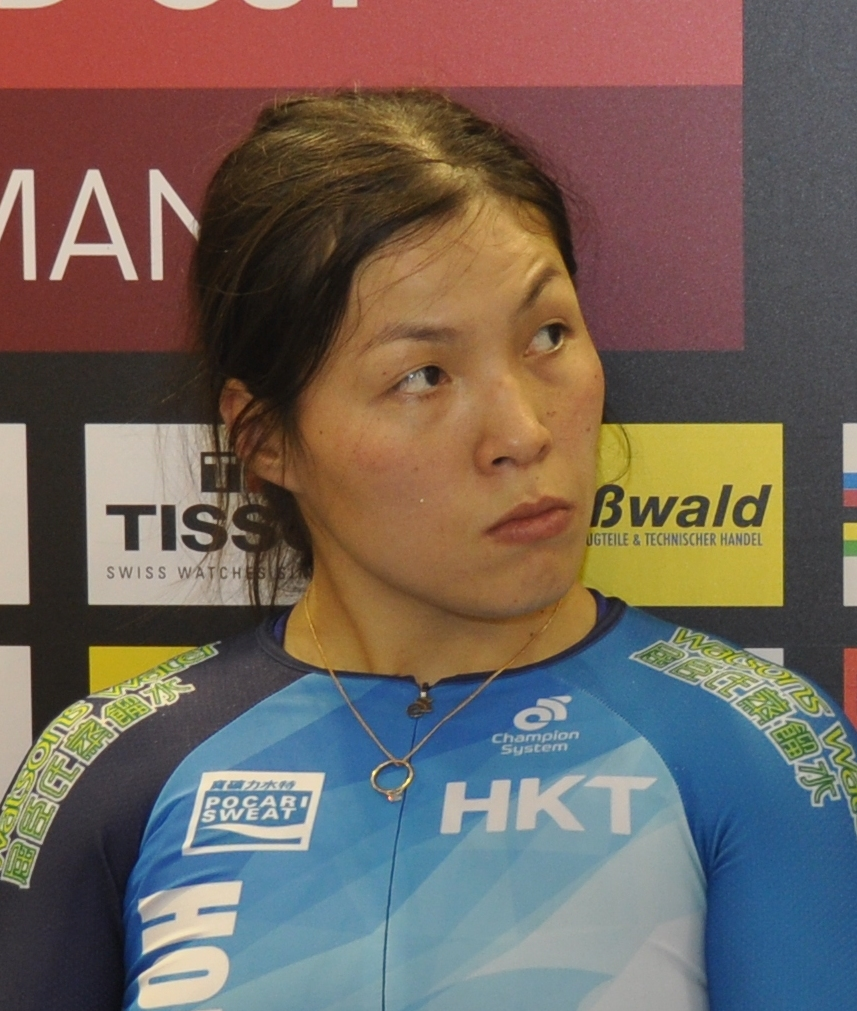
- Lee in 2018

Personal information
- Born: 21 July 1990 (age 36) Hong Kong

Cycling career
- Sport: Cycling
- Discipline: Track cycling

Jessica Lee Hoi-yan (Chinese: 李海恩; born 21 July 1990) is a former Hong Kong cyclist. She competed in the women's keirin event at the 2020 Summer Olympics.

== Career ==
Unlike most athletes who began cycling at a young age, Lee only began competitive cycling in 2014 (at age 24). She joined Hong Kong's national cycling team in 2017. She trained with fellow Hong Kong cyclist Lee Wai-sze.

At the 2018 Asian Games, she placed fourth in keirin and fifth in sprint.

In the 2019–2020 season, she was a bronze medalist in round 6 of the Tissot World Cup.

At the 2020 Summer Olympics, she competed in Keirin and sprint. In the sprint competition, she placed 28th in qualifying and did not advance to subsequent rounds. In the keirin competition, she finished fourth in the first round heat and had to race in the repechage. In the repechage, she also finished fourth, did not advance and was placed 21st. Her career after the Olympics is uncertain. Prior to the competition, news reported that this would be the only Olympic Games she would compete in and that she will retire afterwards to return to Scotland and get married. However, in the media interview immediately after the competition, she was asked if she would compete in the next Olympics. She stated that she was unsure at that point. On February 6, 2022, she announced her retirement from cycling competition.

In 2023, Jess began working for HM Coastguard as a Maritime Operations Officer, based at MRCC Belfast.

She competed in the 2023 Cork Iron-man competition, placing 3rd in her age group and 10th woman overall.

== Personal life ==
Lee emigrated with her family to Scotland at 11 years old. She graduated with a Bachelor of Science degree in physiology and sport science from University of Glasgow in 2013 and worked as a paramedic. She was a rower for the University of Glasgow team. She is a trained chef and pianist, and now lives in Northern Ireland with her fiancé and dog.
