= Lee Wai Sze =

Hong Kong cyclist (born 1987)

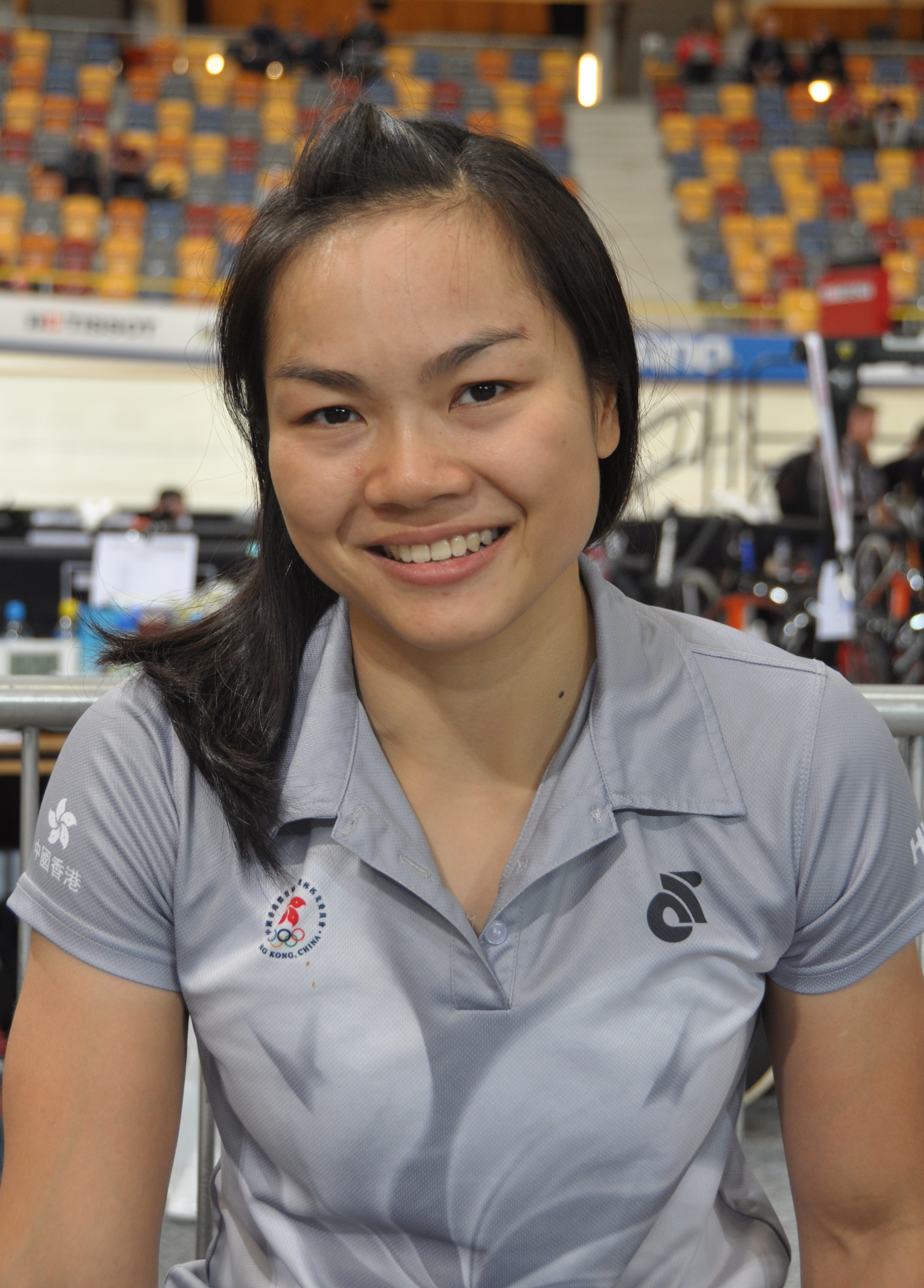
- Lee Wai Sze in 2016

Personal information
- Born: 12 May 1987 (age 39) Kowloon, Hong Kong
- Height: 1.60 m (5 ft 3 in)
- Weight: 54 kg (119 lb)

Cycling career
- Sport: Cycling
- Discipline: Track cycling
- Role: Rider
- Rider type: Sprinter

Major wins
- Time trial 500 m, 2010 Asian Games; Keirin, 2014 Asian Games; Keirin, 2012 Olympic Games; Sprint, 2020 Olympic Games; Keirin, 2012–2013 UCI Track Cycling World Cup Classics; Sprint, 2012–2013 UCI Track Cycling World Cup Classics; Time trial 500m, [ Keirin, 2019 UCI Track Cycling World Championships
Medal record
Women's track cycling
Representing Hong Kong
Olympic Games
Bronze medal – third place	2012 London	Keirin
Bronze medal – third place	2020 Tokyo	Sprint
World Championships
Gold medal – first place	2013 Minsk	500m time trial
Gold medal – first place	2019 Pruszków	Sprint
Gold medal – first place	2019 Pruszków	Keirin
Silver medal – second place	2016 London	500m time trial
Silver medal – second place	2018 Apeldoorn	Keirin
Bronze medal – third place	2013 Minsk	Sprint
Bronze medal – third place	2017 Hong Kong	Sprint
Bronze medal – third place	2020 Berlin	Sprint
Asian Games
Gold medal – first place	2010 Guangzhou	500m time trial
Gold medal – first place	2014 Incheon	Keirin
Gold medal – first place	2014 Incheon	Sprint
Gold medal – first place	2018 Jakarta-Palembang	Keirin
Gold medal – first place	2018 Jakarta-Palembang	Sprint
Silver medal – second place	2018 Jakarta-Palembang	Team sprint
Bronze medal – third place	2010 Guangzhou	Sprint
Asian Championships
Gold medal – first place	2011 Nakhon Ratchasima	500 m time trial
Gold medal – first place	2012 Kuala Lumpur	Sprint
Gold medal – first place	2012 Kuala Lumpur	500 m time trial
Gold medal – first place	2013 New Delhi	500 m time trial
Gold medal – first place	2013 New Delhi	Keirin
Gold medal – first place	2014 Astana	500 m time trial
Gold medal – first place	2014 Astana	Keirin
Gold medal – first place	2015 Nakhon Ratchasima	Sprint
Gold medal – first place	2015 Nakhon Ratchasima	500 m time trial
Gold medal – first place	2016 Izu	Keirin
Gold medal – first place	2017 New Delhi	Keirin
Gold medal – first place	2017 New Delhi	Sprint
Gold medal – first place	2017 New Delhi	500 m time trial
Gold medal – first place	2018 Nilai	Keirin
Gold medal – first place	2018 Nilai	Sprint
Gold medal – first place	2018 Nilai	500 m time trial
Gold medal – first place	2019 Jakarta	Sprint
Gold medal – first place	2020 Jincheon	Keirin
Gold medal – first place	2020 Jincheon	Sprint
Silver medal – second place	2009 Tenggarong	500 m time trial
Silver medal – second place	2010 Sharjah	500 m time trial
Silver medal – second place	2016 Izu	500 m time trial
Silver medal – second place	2017 New Delhi	Team sprint
Silver medal – second place	2019 Jakarta	Keirin
Bronze medal – third place	2010 Sharjah	Sprint
Bronze medal – third place	2010 Sharjah	Team sprint
Bronze medal – third place	2011 Nakhon Ratchasima	Sprint
Bronze medal – third place	2011 Nakhon Ratchasima	Team sprint
Bronze medal – third place	2012 Kuala Lumpur	Sprint
Bronze medal – third place	2012 Kuala Lumpur	Keirin
Bronze medal – third place	2014 Astana	Sprint
Bronze medal – third place	2015 Nakhon Ratchasima	Keirin
Bronze medal – third place	2016 Izu	Sprint
Bronze medal – third place	2019 Jakarta	Team sprint

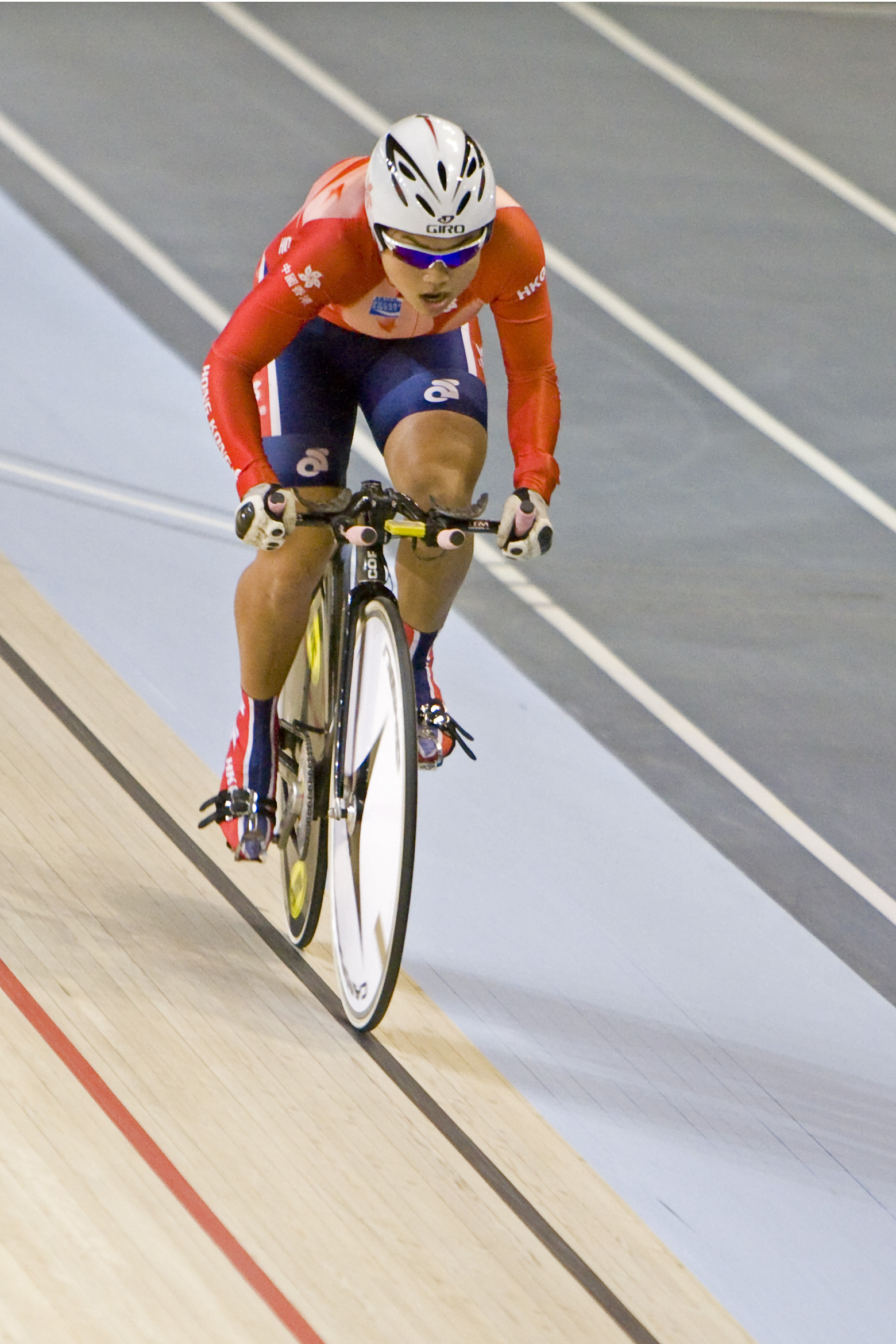
Lee Wai Sze at the UCI Track Cycling World Championships in 2010

Sarah Lee Wai Sze, BBS, MH (Chinese: 李慧詩; Jyutping: lei^{5} wai^{6} si^{1}; born 12 May 1987) is a former Hong Kong professional track cyclist.

Her greatest success to date is winning the bronze medal in the women's keirin at the 2012 London Olympics, Hong Kong's third-ever Olympic medal and first in cycling. She won a second Olympic bronze medal in the women's sprint at the 2020 Tokyo Olympics, making her the first Hong Kong athlete to win medals in two different Olympic Games.

== Early years ==
Lee was born on 12 May 1987 in Lower Ngau Tau Kok Estate, Hong Kong. She grew up in a poor family in Ngau Tau Kok, sharing a 200-square-foot public flat with her parents and two older siblings. Lee attended two schools in the locality, Bishop Paschang Catholic School and Leung Shek Chee College.

Although she was born with anemia, Lee represented her school in athletics in 100 and 400-metre dash. At Form 3, her school recommended her to the Hong Kong Sports Institute and her talent was spotted by the Hong Kong Cycling Association.

== Career ==
Lee became a full-time athlete in 2004. Initially trained as a road cyclist, Lee was in danger of bowing out of cycling after a serious accident in 2006 as she swerved to avoid a stray dog during training, where she suffered a broken left scaphoid bone. Lee is coached by Jinkang Shen, who has also coached other successful Hong Kong cyclist including Kam-Po Wong.

=== 2010 ===
Lee captured the attention of Hong Kong when she won gold at the 500-meter time trial track cycling event at the 2010 Asian Games, in which she broke the Asian Record in winning the championship with a time of 33.945 s. Lee also won a bronze in the sprint event. In December 2010, Lee improved her Asian Record in 500-meter time trial with a time of 33.939 s in the 2010 Melbourne Track Cycling World Cup. Lee's performance has impressed the cycling hierarchy, and she received the Hong Kong Potential Sports Stars Awards for 2010. She also received the Medal of Honour from the Hong Kong Government in 2011 for her outstanding achievements in international cycling competitions.

=== 2012 ===
In February 2012 at the 2012 London Track Cycling World Cup, Lee upset Olympic champion Victoria Pendleton to win a bronze medal in the sprint event at the London Velodrome. She beat Pendleton 2–1 after losing to eventual champion Guo Shuang of China in the semi-finals. Lee also won a silver in the keirin final. The Union Cycliste Internationale described 24-year-old Lee as "a late revelation in the sprint events" after she claimed her second medal.

Lee was chosen as the flag bearer of the Hong Kong Olympic Representatives for the 2012 Summer Olympics in London. She won the bronze medal in women's keirin. Lee's bronze medal feat handed Hong Kong their first ever Olympic medal in cycling, and only their third overall. Lee also participated in the women's sprint event although she did not progress through the 1/8 Finals after losing to Cuba's Lisandra Guerra. Lee eventually finished at the 10th place. Lee received HK$ 750k from the Hang Seng Athlete Incentive Awards Scheme for her achievement in the Games. In an interview with Ming Pao, Lee said she hoped her achievement in the London Olympics can inspire a new generation of Hong Kong athletes for the 2016 Olympic Games. She loved cycling but she is going to retire soon.

=== 2013 ===
After the Olympics, Lee had a perfect start in the 2012–13 World Cup opening series with a gold medal in the women's sprint in Cali, Colombia, which is her first victory in a World Cup event. This is followed by a bronze in women's keirin in the second leg, which was held in Glasgow, Scotland. Lee won her first medal in 2013 by coming third in the women's sprint event in the third leg of the 2012–13 World Cup series.

In February 2013, Lee carried on her good form and won gold in the women's 500m time-trial at the World Track Championships in Belarus. She became the first female and third overall athlete from Hong Kong to wear rainbow jersey. After the gold, Lee beat Guo Shuang of China in Women's Sprint and won a bronze medal, securing her second medal in Minsk. This is the first time any HK athlete won multiple medals at a World Championship event.

=== 2014 ===
At the 2014 Asian Games, she won gold medals in Keirin and Sprint. She also won gold in the Asian Cycling Championships for Keirin and 500m time-trial, plus a bronze in Sprint.

=== 2016 ===
At the 2016 Summer Olympics, in the keirin competition, she advanced to second round after coming in first in her heat. However, in the second round, she crashed after colliding with Anna Meares of Australia and could not finish the race. She was placed 7th in the competition. On the next day, despite still nursing her injuries from her crash from yesterday, she competed in the sprint competition. She won in first and second rounds but lost to Kristina Vogel of Germany in the quarterfinals. She finished 6th in this competition.

=== 2018 ===
Lee successfully defended her title in Keirin and 200m time-trial at the 2018 Asian Games.

=== 2019 ===
In 2019 UCI Track Cycling World Championships, Lee claimed gold in sprint and keirin. She became the only athlete from Hong Kong to earn multiple rainbow jerseys.

=== 2021 ===
At the 2020 Summer Olympics, Lee competed in both sprint and Keirin. In the keirin event, she lost in her heat in the first round but won in the repechage to advance to quarterfinals. She finished first in her quarterfinal heat to advance to the semifinals. However, she finished 5th in her heat and competed in the B Final for placement. She finished 8th overall in this event. In the sprint event, Lee advanced to 1/16 finals but lost to Katy Marchant of Great Britain to fall into the repechage. She won in the repechage and advanced to 1/8 final. She won in 1/8 final and quarterfinal. In the semifinals, she lost to Olena Starikova from Ukraine and had to race in the bronze medal match against the reigning world champion Emma Hinze of Germany. She won the bronze medal match and became the first Hong Kong Olympian with medals from different Olympic Games.

== Personal life ==
Lee's idol is Great Britain's six-time Olympic champion Sir Chris Hoy.

Lee is a Baptist Christian. In 2009, she enrolled on a distance-learning course to study theology with the New York Theological Education Center Chinese Online School of Theology.

== Achievements ==
2009
Asian Cycling Championships

2nd 500 m Time trial

ACC Track Asia Cup

1st Keirin, Bangkok
1st 500 m Time trial
1st Team Sprint (with Meng Zhao Juan)
1st Sprint

2010
2009–2010 UCI Track Cycling World Cup Classics

3rd Keirin, Beijing

Asian Games

1st 10m Time
3rd Sprint

Asian Cycling Championships

2nd 500 m Time trial
3rd Sprint
3rd Team Sprint (with EXZhao Juan)

ACC Track Asia Cup

1st 500 m Time trial, Hakodate
1st Sprint, Hakodate
2nd Team Sprint (with Meng Zhao Juan), Hakodate
2nd Keirin, Hakodate
1st 500 m Time trial, Kuala Lumpur
2nd Sprint, Kuala Lumpur
2nd Keirin, Kuala Lumpur
1st 500 m Time trial, Bangkok
2nd Sprint, Bangkok
2nd Keirin, Bangkok
2nd Team Sprint (with Meng Zhao Juan), Bangkok

2011
2010–2011 UCI Track Cycling World Cup Classics

3rd 500 m Time trial,, Melbourne

Asian Cycling Championships

1st 500 m Time trial
3rd Sprint
3rd Team Sprint (with Meng Zhao Juan)

ACC Track Asia Cup

1st Sprint, Bangkok
1st Team Sprint, Bangkok (with Meng Zhao Juan)
1st Sprint, Kuala Lumpur
1st Keirin, Kuala Lumpur
1st 500 m Time trial, Kuala Lumpur
1st Team Sprint (with Wang Xiao Fei), Kuala Lumpur

All China National Track Cycling Championships

3rd Sprint
2nd 500 m Time trial

2010–11 UCI Track Cycling World Ranking
1st 500 m Time trial

2012
Olympic Games

3rd Keirin

2011–2012 UCI Track Cycling World Cup Classics

2nd Keirin, London
3rd Sprint, London

Asian Cycling Championships

1st 500 m Time trial
1st Sprint
3rd Keirin

All China National Track Cycling Championships

2nd Keirin
2nd 500 m Time trial
3rd Sprint

UCI Track Cycling World Ranking
1st Sprint

2013
UCI Track World Championships

1st 500 m time trial
3rd Sprint

2012–2013 UCI Track Cycling World Cup Classics

1st Sprint, Cali
3rd Keirin, Glasgow
3rd Sprint, Aguascalientes
Overall 1st Keirin
Overall 1st Sprint

Asian Cycling Championships

1st 500 m Time trial
1st Keirin

UCI Track Cycling World Ranking
1st Time trial
1st Keirin
2014
Asian Track Championships

1st Keirin
1st 500m Time Trial
3rd Sprint

Asian Games

1st Keirin
1st Sprint

Hong Kong International Track Cup

1st 500m Time Trial
2nd Keirin
2nd Sprint

South Australian Track Classic
1st Sprint

2nd Keirin

Incheon International Track Competition

1st Keirin
1st Sprint

Hong Kong International Track Classic

1st Keirin
1st Sprint

Hong Kong International Track Cup

1st Keirin
1st Sprint

2015
Asian Track Championships

1st Sprint
1st 500m Time Trial
3rd Keirin

Melbourne Cup on Wheels

1st Keirin
1st Sprint

South Australian Grand Prix

1st Sprint
2nd Keirin

Super Drome Cup

1st Keirin
1st Sprint

2016
Asian Track Championships

1st Keirin
2nd 500m Time Trial
3rd Sprint

ITS Melbourne DISC Grand Prix

1st Keirin
1st Sprint

ITS Melbourne Grand Prix

1st Keirin
1st Sprint

2017
Asian Track Championships

1st Keirin
1st Sprint
1st 500m Time Trial
2nd Team Sprint (with Ma Wing Yu)

3rd Sprint, World Track Championships
2021
Olympic Games

3rd Sprint

Summer Olympics
Preceded by Wong Kam-po	Flagbearer for Hong Kong; London 2012	Succeeded by Stephanie Au
