= Kaarle McCulloch =

Australian cyclist

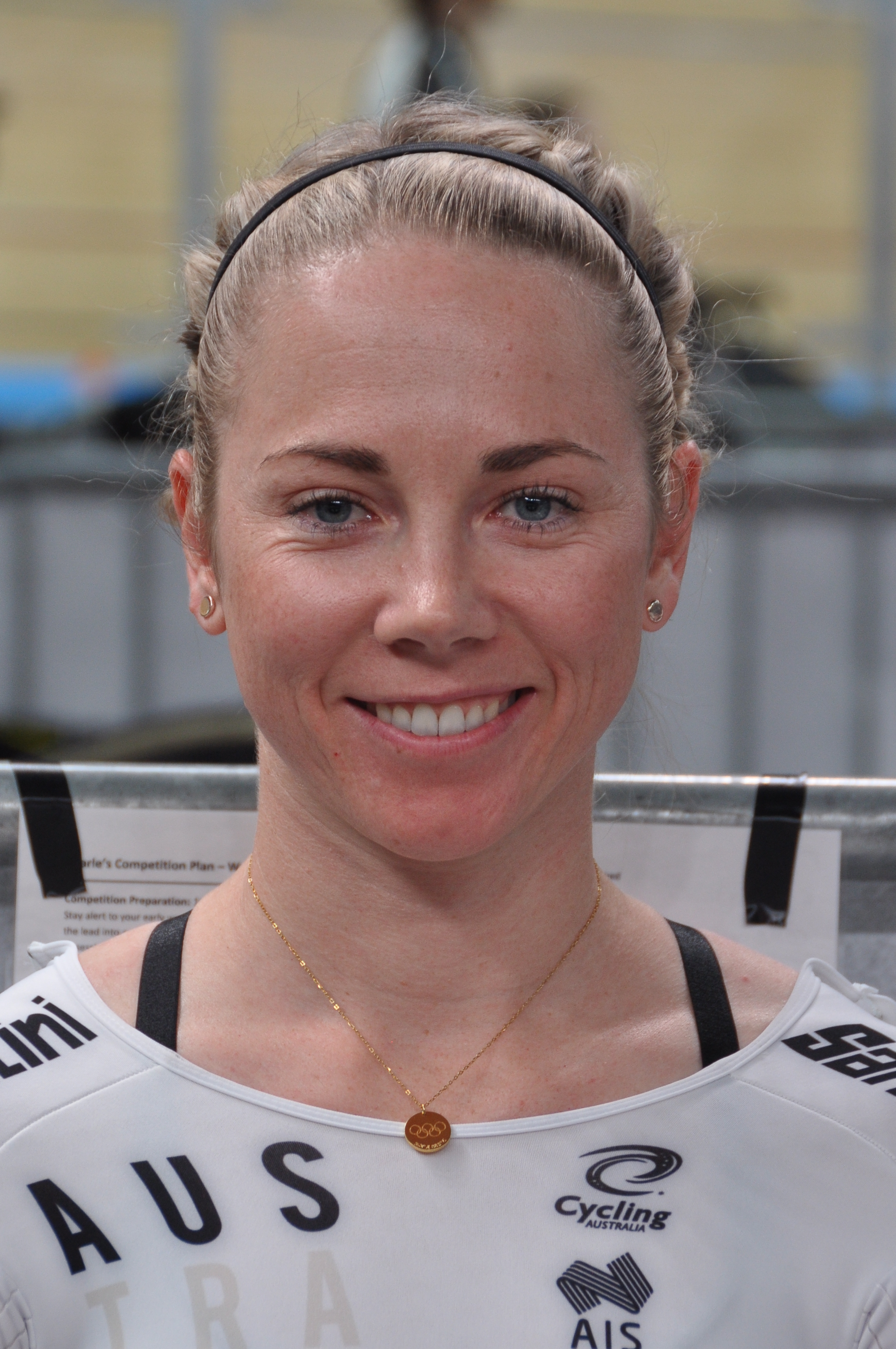

Personal information
- Born: 20 January 1988 (age 38) Campbelltown, New South Wales, Australia
- Height: 1.68 m (5 ft 6 in)
- Weight: 70 kg (154 lb)

Cycling career
- Sport: Cycling
- Discipline: Track
- Role: Rider
- Rider type: Sprinter
Medal record
Women's track cycling
Representing Australia
Olympic Games
Bronze medal – third place	2012 London	Team sprint
World Championships
Gold medal – first place	2009 Pruszków	Team sprint
Gold medal – first place	2010 Ballerup	Team sprint
Gold medal – first place	2011 Apeldoorn	Team sprint
Gold medal – first place	2019 Pruszków	Team sprint
Silver medal – second place	2012 Melbourne	Team sprint
Silver medal – second place	2017 Hong Kong	Team sprint
Silver medal – second place	2019 Pruszków	Keirin
Silver medal – second place	2020 Berlin	Team sprint
Bronze medal – third place	2015 Yvelines	Team sprint
Bronze medal – third place	2019 Pruszków	500 m time trial
Commonwealth Games
Gold medal – first place	2010 Delhi	Team sprint
Gold medal – first place	2018 Gold Coast	Team sprint
Gold medal – first place	2018 Gold Coast	500 m time trial
Silver medal – second place	2010 Delhi	500 m time trial
Silver medal – second place	2018 Gold Coast	Keirin
Bronze medal – third place	2018 Gold Coast	Sprint
Junior World Championships
Bronze medal – third place	2006 Ghent	500 m time trial

Kaarle McCulloch (born 20 January 1988) is an Australian former professional track cyclist and four-time World Champion in the team sprint. She also won three golds at the Commonwealth Games and an Olympic bronze medal. She qualified for the Tokyo 2020 Olympics and rode in two events, the Women's Keirin, where she came ninth, and the Women's Sprint, where she came thirteenth.

== Early years ==
McCulloch grew up in Gymea, New South Wales. She was a promising middle-distance runner and won middle-distance championships in the 400 metres and 800 metres events when she was 14, 15, and 16.

When she was 17, her motivation in track and field waned and she turned to cycling to reinvigorate her Olympic dream. Her stepfather Ken Bates introduced her to track cycling. She rose through the ranks quickly, eventually competing at the UCI Junior Track World Championships.

McCulloch honed her cycling skills at the St George Cycling Club where her sporting family supported her. Each of the McCulloch siblings pursued their own sporting dreams. Her younger sister, Abbey McCulloch, is a netball player. She captained the New South Wales Swifts. Kaarle and Abbey both attended Endeavour Sports High School. Her younger brother Jack also rode for St George Cycling Club.

== Achievements ==
McCulloch was part of the Australian sprint team that won bronze at the 2012 Summer Olympics.

At the 2010 Commonwealth Games, she won a gold medal in the Team sprint and a silver medal in the 500m Time Trial.

McCulloch took a break from cycling following the London Olympics due to a knee injury, missing the 2014 Commonwealth Games. In 2016, she missed selection for the Rio Olympics due to a contentious decision to send former teammate Anna Meares.

McCulloch returned for the 2018 Commonwealth Games, winning Gold in the 500m Time Trial and Team Sprint and silver in the Keiran, and Bronze in the Sprint.

She retired from competition in November 2021.

She has a university degree in Personal Development, Health and Physical Education (PDHPE) teaching.

In February 2022, she was appointed as Podium Women’s Sprint Coach for the Great Britain Cycling Team, replacing Jan van Eijden, who left the role in November 2021.

== Palmarès ==
2006
Australian National Track Championships – Juniors

1st 500m Time Trial
1st Sprint
3rd Keirin

2nd Team Sprint, Australian National Track Championships, Adelaide – Elite
3rd Track World Championships, Ghent – Juniors
Oceania Games

3rd 500m Time Trial
3rd Sprint, Oceania Games

2007
2nd Team Sprint, World Cup, Los Angeles
Australian National Track Championships

3rd 500m Time Trial
2nd Team Sprint

Oceania Cycling Championships

3rd Sprint
1st Keirin
1st Team Sprint

1st 500m Time Trial, European Championship
2nd Team Sprint, World Cup Sydney
2008
3rd Team Sprint, World Cup, Los Angeles
2009
1st Team Sprint (with Anna Meares), 2009–2010 UCI Track Cycling World Cup Classics, Manchester
1st Team sprint, 2008–09 UCI Track Cycling World Ranking
2010
1st Team Sprint, Track World Championships
Commonwealth Games

1st Team Sprint
2nd 500m Time Trial

2011
1st Team Sprint (with Anna Meares), UCI Track World Championships
2012
3rd Team Sprint, Olympic Games
2nd Team Sprint (with Anna Meares), UCI Track World Championships
2013
2nd Sprint, Invercargill
2014
Oceania Track Championships

1st Team Sprint (with Stephanie Morton)
3rd Sprint

2015
Oceania Track Championships

1st Sprint
1st 500m Time Trial

2nd Sprint, Super Drome Cup
Melbourne Cup on Wheels

3rd Keirin
3rd Sprint

2016
Oceania Track Championships

1st Sprint
1st 500m time trial

ITS Melbourne DISC Grand Prix

2nd Keirin
3rd Sprint

3rd Sprint, ITS Melbourne Grand Prix
2017
Oceania Track Championships

1st Team Sprint (with Stephanie Morton)
2nd Sprint

2nd Team Sprint, UCI World Track Championships (with Stephanie Morton)
US Sprint GP

2nd Keirin
3rd Sprint

2nd Sprint, ITS Melbourne – DISC Grand Prix
ITS Melbourne – Hisense Grand Prix

2nd Sprint
2nd Keirin

Austral

3rd Keirin
3rd Sprint

3rd Keirin, Fastest Man on Wheels
3rd Sprint, Keirin Cup / Madison Cup
2018
Commonwealth Games

1st Team Sprint (with Stephanie Morton)
1st 500m Time Trial
2nd Keirin
3rd Sprint
