= Madalyn Godby =

American cyclist (born 1992)

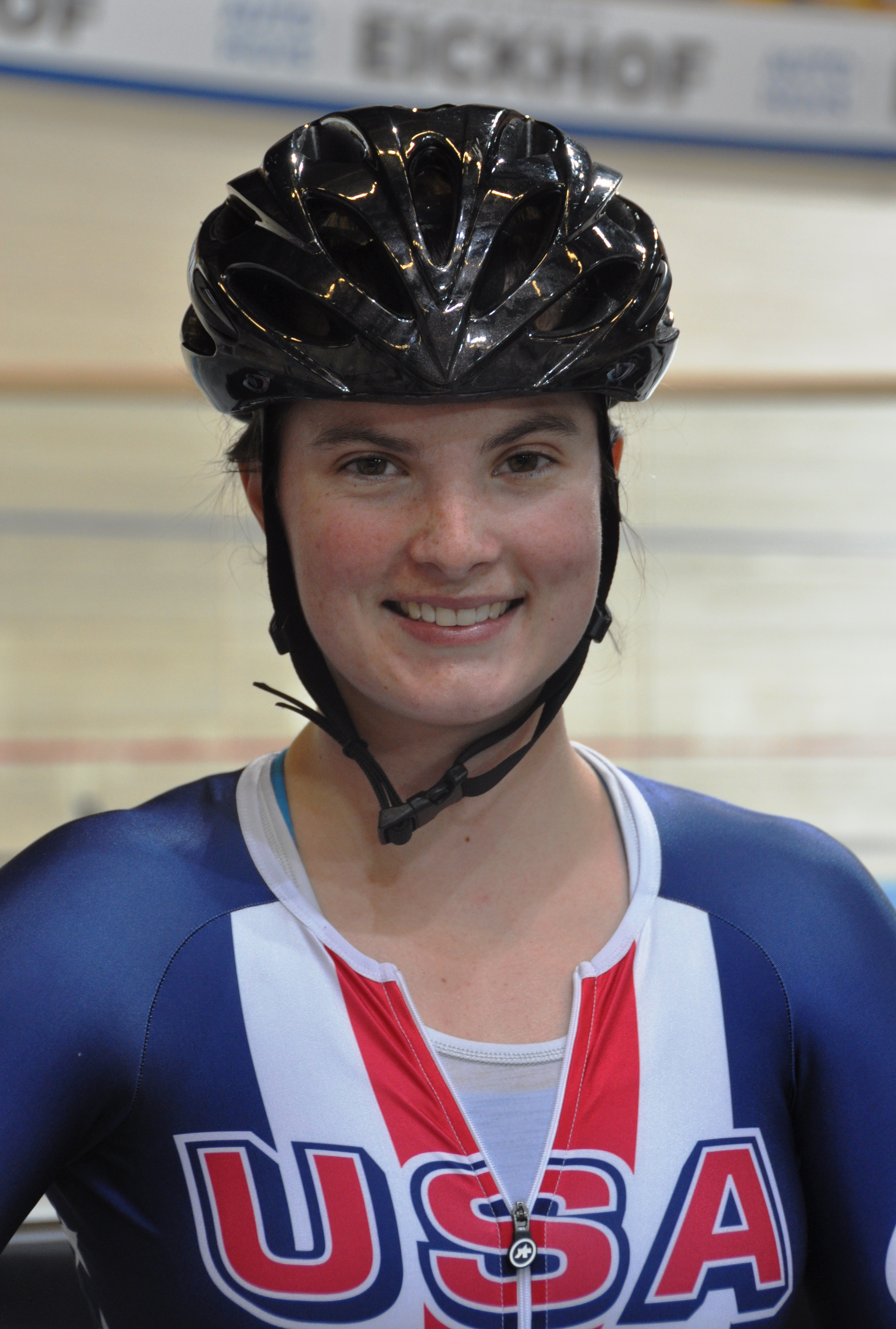
- Madalyn Godby (2016)

Personal information
- Born: September 5, 1992 (age 34) Boulder, Colorado, United States

Cycling career
- Sport: Cycling
- Discipline: Track cycling
Medal record
Women's track cycling
Representing United States
Pan American Championships
Gold medal – first place	2017 Couva	Team sprint
Silver medal – second place	2018 Aguascalientes	Team sprint
Bronze medal – third place	2013 Mexico City	500m time trial
Bronze medal – third place	2016 Aguascalientes	Team sprint
Bronze medal – third place	2017 Couva	Sprint

Madalyn Godby (born September 5, 1992) is an American track cyclist, representing the United States at international competitions. Godby is the current U.S. women's national record holder in the flying 200m (10.555), standing 250m (19.398), and team sprint (33.353).

== Career ==
Her notable wins include women’s keirin at the World Cup in Milton during the 2018–19 season and women’s keirin at the World Cup in Santiago during the 2017–18 season.

She has qualified to represent the United States at the 2020 Summer Olympics.

== Career Results ==
2013
Challenge International sur piste

1st Keirin
1st Sprint

Los Angeles Grand Prix

2nd Team Sprint (Alissa Maglaty)
3rd Sprint

2015
2nd Sprint, International Belgian Open
3rd Keirin, Grand Prix of Colorado Springs
3rd Sprint, Champions of Sprint
2016
3rd Team Sprint, Pan American Track Championships (with Mandy Marquardt)
2017
Easter International Grand Prix

1st Keirin
3rd Sprint

1st Team Sprint, Fastest Man on Wheels (with Mandy Marquardt)
2018
USA Cycling National Track Championships

1st Sprint
1st Keirin

2nd Team Sprint (with Paige Gray)
2018–19
Tissot UCI Track Cycling World Cup Milton

1st Keirin
