= Yuka Kobayashi =

Japanese track cyclist

Yūka Kobayashi
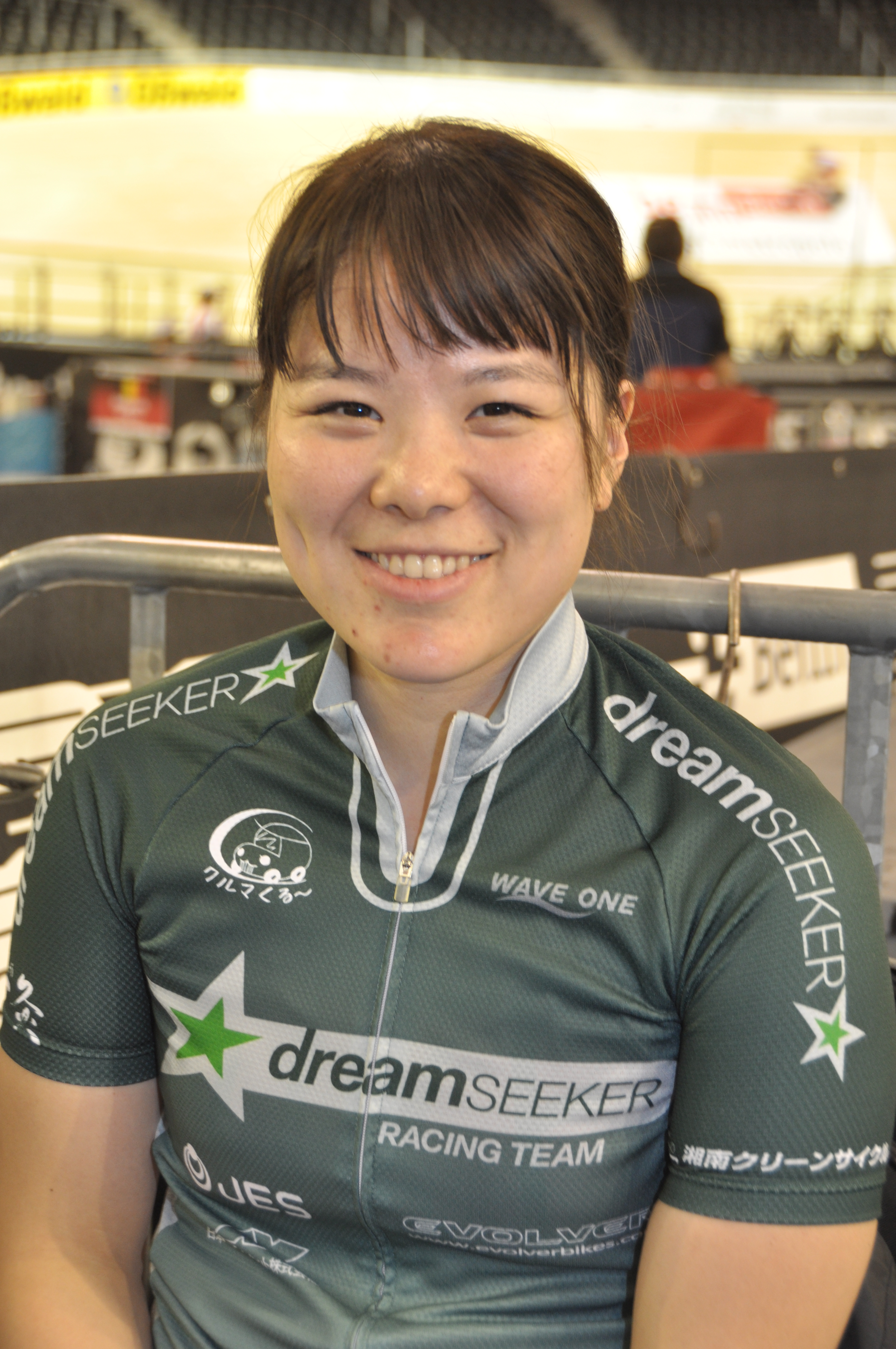
- Yūka Kobayashi (2018)

Personal information
- Born: January 18, 1994 (age 32) Tosu, Saga Prefecture
- Height: 1.64 m (5 ft 4 1/2 in)
- Weight: 144 lb (65 kg)

Cycling career
- Sport: Cycling
- Discipline: Track
- Role: Rider
Medal record
Representing Japan
Women's track cycling
Asian Championships
| Gold medal – first place | 2019 Jakarta | Keirin |
| Silver medal – second place | 2020 Jincheon | Keirin |
| Silver medal – second place | 2022 New Delhi | Sprint |
| Silver medal – second place | 2022 New Delhi | Team sprint |
| Bronze medal – third place | 2020 Jincheon | Sprint |

Yūka Kobayashi (小林 優香, Kobayashi Yūka; January 1, 1994) comes from Tosu, Fukuoka Prefecture, Japan. She is a professional track cyclist.

== Early life ==
As a high school student, she was a member of the Kumamoto Municipal High School volleyball team. In 2010, she participated in the National High School Sports Festival Volleyball Games. In 2013, she graduated from the Japan Keirin School in the 106th class.

Her vertical jump reached 60 cm. But due to her short stature, her career as a volleyball player was limited. In 2012, she watched the London Olympic men's team sprint on TV by chance, was immediately attracted to Girls Keirin and resolved to aspire.

== Career in Keirin cycling ==
On December 20, 2012, she attended the Keirin school aptitude test and passed. During her education at the Japan Keirin School, she broke the school records over 200m flying dash (11.94s), 400m flying dash (24.08s), 1000m time trial (1.12.65) and 2000m time trial and was awarded the golden cap for her outstanding performance.

Together with her classmate Takako Ishii, she broke the national record in the olympic sprint over the distance of 800 m in 56,33 seconds.

On January 24, 2014, Yuka Kobayashi won the Keirin race at the Japan Track Cup and placed second in the sprint. Yuka Kobayashi and Takako Ishii placed 10th in the Olympic Sprint at the 2014 UCI Track Cycling World Championships.

She graduated from Keirin school in March 2014. In the graduation race finals, she only scored third, but was distinguished as # 1 of her graduating class for winning 50 of 58 races until graduation. At the 83rd All Japan Cycling Championships on April 19–20, she reached the third place in the 500 m time trial (37.229s).

On May 16, 2014, she celebrated her debut as a professional keirin cyclist on the Kishiwada Velodrome and won against the second placed Mashimo Ruruko with a distance of six bicycle lengths. Her winning streak of 17 consecutive victories broke the former record for female keirin pros in Japan. In September 2014, she was only beaten after 22 consecutive victories. From May 2014 to January 2015, she won 50 of a total of 52 races. At the Japanese Track Cycling Championships in April 2015, she won the Team Sprint, scored second in the 500 m time trial and third in the Keirin race. On March 22, June 21 and August 23, 2015, she won three top-rated races (G 1 and G 2 category) against her strongest competitors in Japan. She won the Keirin Grand Prix 2015 in December 2015 with a premium of 10 million yen and earned 29.8 million yen during the 2015 track season. Until March 2018, she won 177 of the 194 races she participated and achieved a record victory score of 91.2%. Until 2023 she earned a premium of 100 million yen.

On 8 and 9 August 2014 she won the Girls Keirin Festival on the Matsudo Velodrome. On November 3, 2015, she won her 100th keirin race. Until she slimmed down from 82 to 65 kg after a severe race accident in 2016, she had 27.5 inch thighs (68.5 cm). Despite losing 17 kg, her thighs only shrunk down to 26 inches (65 cm). Her enormous physical strength - she does leg presses with 280 kg for reps and presses a maximum weight of 500 kg- contributes to her enormous ability to maintain her high maximum speed (60.5 km/h) over a long time span of 23.83 seconds. On a roller, she even reached a speed of 79.8 km/h. On February 27, 2020, at the Track World Championships in Berlin, she scored a new Japanese record in the 200m sprint with 10.712 seconds (= 67.2 km/h).

== Career results ==
2014
Japan Track Cup 1

1st Keirin
2nd Sprint

1st Keirin, Japan Track Cup 2
2nd Keirin, Japan Track Cup 2
2nd Sprint, Track Clubs ACC Cup

2016
3rd 500m Time Trial, Taiwan Hsin-Chu Track International Classic

2017
1st Keirin, US Sprint GP
1st Keirin, Keirin Cup / Madison Cup
National Track Championships

1st Keirin
2nd Sprint

2nd Keirin, Fastest Man on Wheels

2018
3rd Keirin, UCI Track World Cup Berlin

2019
1st Keirin, Asian Track Championships, Jakarta

3rd Keirin, World Cup, Hong Kong

2020
2nd Asian Track Championships, Keirin
3rd Asian Track Championships, Sprint

2021
1st Nation's Cup Hogkong, Keirin

2022
2nd Asian Championships, Sprint
