= Netherlands at the 2020 Summer Olympics =

- Flag of the Netherlands
- IOC code: NED
- NOC: Dutch Olympic Committee*; Dutch Sports Federation
- Website: www.nocnsf.nl (in Dutch)

in Tokyo, Japan 23 July 2021 – 8 August 2021
- Competitors: 278 (113 men and 165 women) in 27 sports
- Flag bearers (opening): Churandy Martina; Keet Oldenbeuving
- Flag bearer (closing): Sifan Hassan
- Medals Ranked 7th: Gold 10 Silver 12 Bronze 14 Total 36

Summer Olympics appearances (overview)
- 1900; 1904; 1908; 1912; 1920; 1924; 1928; 1932; 1936; 1948; 1952; 1956; 1960; 1964; 1968; 1972; 1976; 1980; 1984; 1988; 1992; 1996; 2000; 2004; 2008; 2012; 2016; 2020; 2024; 2028

Other related appearances
- 1906 Intercalated Games

The Netherlands competed at the 2020 Summer Olympics in Tokyo. Originally scheduled to take place from 24 July to 9 August 2020, the Games were postponed to 23 July to 8 August 2021, because of the COVID-19 pandemic. Dutch athletes have competed at every edition of the Summer Olympic Games, with the exception of the sparsely attended 1904 Summer Olympics in St. Louis and 1956 Summer Olympics in Melbourne (except the equestrian events in Stockholm), which the Netherlands boycotted because of the Soviet invasion of Hungary.

== Medalists ==
On 28 July, the Netherlands won eight medals on a single day, which broke the country's previous record of seven established on 11 August 1928 during the 1928 Summer Olympics in Amsterdam.

Medal	Name	Sport	Event	Date
Gold	Koen Metsemakers; Dirk Uittenbogaard; Abe Wiersma; Tone Wieten	Rowing	Men's quadruple sculls	28 July
Gold	Annemiek van Vleuten	Cycling	Women's road time trial	28 July
Gold	Niek Kimmann	Cycling	Men's BMX racing	30 July
Gold	Kiran Badloe	Sailing	Men's RS:X	31 July
Gold	Sifan Hassan	Athletics	Women's 5000 metres	2 August
Gold	Roy van den Berg; Matthijs Büchli; Jeffrey Hoogland; Harrie Lavreysen	Cycling	Men's team sprint	3 August
Gold	Shanne Braspennincx	Cycling	Women's keirin	5 August
Gold	Harrie Lavreysen	Cycling	Men's sprint	6 August
Gold	Women's field hockey team: Felice Albers Margot van Geffen Eva de Goede Marloes Keetels Josine Koning Sanne Koolen Laurien Leurink Caia van Maasakker Frédérique Matla Laura Nunnink Malou Pheninckx Pien Sanders Lauren Stam Maria Verschoor Xan de Waard Lidewij Welten	Field hockey	Women's tournament	6 August
Gold	Sifan Hassan	Athletics	Women's 10,000 metres	7 August
Silver	Steve Wijler; Gabriela Schloesser	Archery	Mixed team	24 July
Silver	Annemiek van Vleuten	Cycling	Women's individual road race	25 July
Silver	Arno Kamminga	Swimming	Men's 100 metre breaststroke	26 July
Silver	Stef Broenink; Melvin Twellaar	Rowing	Men's double sculls	28 July
Silver	Ymkje Clevering; Karolien Florijn; Ellen Hogerwerf; Veronique Meester	Rowing	Women's coxless four	28 July
Silver	Tom Dumoulin	Cycling	Men's road time trial	28 July
Silver	Arno Kamminga	Swimming	Men's 200 metre breaststroke	29 July
Silver	Sharon van Rouwendaal	Swimming	Women's marathon 10 km	4 August
Silver	Anouk Vetter	Athletics	Women's heptathlon	5 August
Silver	Jeffrey Hoogland	Cycling	Men's sprint	6 August
Silver	Terrence Agard; Ramsey Angela; Liemarvin Bonevacia; Tony van Diepen; Jochem Dobber	Athletics	Men's 4 × 400 metres relay	7 August
Silver	Abdi Nageeye	Athletics	Men's marathon	8 August
Bronze	Roos de Jong; Lisa Scheenaard	Rowing	Women's double sculls	28 July
Bronze	Anna van der Breggen	Cycling	Women's road time trial	28 July
Bronze	Sanne van Dijke	Judo	Women's −70 kg	28 July
Bronze	Marieke Keijser; Ilse Paulis	Rowing	Women's lightweight double sculls	29 July
Bronze	Merel Smulders	Cycling	Women's BMX racing	30 July
Bronze	Marit Bouwmeester	Sailing	Women's Laser Radial	1 August
Bronze	Annemiek Bekkering; Annette Duetz	Sailing	Women's 49er FX	3 August
Bronze	Femke Bol	Athletics	Women's 400 metres hurdles	4 August
Bronze	Maikel van der Vleuten	Equestrian	Individual jumping	4 August
Bronze	Emma Oosterwegel	Athletics	Women's heptathlon	5 August
Bronze	Nouchka Fontijn	Boxing	Women's middleweight	6 August
Bronze	Sifan Hassan	Athletics	Women's 1500 metres	6 August
Bronze	Harrie Lavreysen	Cycling	Men's keirin	8 August
Bronze	Kirsten Wild	Cycling	Women's omnium	8 August

Medals by sport
Sport	1st place, gold medalist(s)	2nd place, silver medalist(s)	3rd place, bronze medalist(s)	Total
Archery	0	1	0	1
Athletics	2	3	3	8
Boxing	0	0	1	1
Cycling	5	3	4	12
Equestrian	0	0	1	1
Field hockey	1	0	0	1
Judo	0	0	1	1
Rowing	1	2	2	5
Sailing	1	0	2	3
Swimming	0	3	0	3
Total	10	12	14	36

== Competitors ==
The following is the list of number of Dutch competitors in the Games.

Sport	Men	Women	Total
Archery	3	1	4
Artistic swimming	—N/a	2	2
Athletics	18	25	43
Badminton	2	2	4
Basketball	4	0	4
Boxing	1	1	2
Canoeing	0	1	1
Cycling	16	13	29
Diving	0	2	2
Equestrian	5	3	8
Fencing	1	0	1
Field hockey	16	16	32
Football	0	22	22
Golf	0	1	1
Gymnastics	2	4	6
Handball	0	14	14
Judo	5	5	10
Rowing	21	14	35
Sailing	4	6	10
Skateboarding	0	2	2
Swimming	8	8	16
Table tennis	0	1	1
Tennis	2	2	4
Triathlon	2	2	4
Volleyball	2	4	6
Water polo	0	13	13
Weightlifting	1	0	1
Total	113	165	278

== Archery ==
Three Dutch archers qualified for the men's events by reaching the quarterfinal stage of the men's team recurve at the 2019 World Archery Championships in 's-Hertogenbosch. Another Dutch archer scored a shoot-off victory in the quarterfinal round of the women's individual recurve to book an outright Olympic berth available at the 2019 European Games in Minsk, Belarus.

Athlete	Event	Ranking round		Round of 64	Round of 32	Round of 16	Quarterfinal	Semifinal	Final / BM	
Athlete	Event	Score	Seed	Opposition Score	Opposition Score	Opposition Score	Opposition Score	Opposition Score	Opposition Score	Rank
Gijs Broeksma	Men's individual	667	14	Chirault (FRA); W 6–4	Furukawa (JPN); L 5–6	Did not advance				
Sjef van den Berg	Men's individual	670	8	Valladont (FRA); W 7–3	D'Almeida (BRA); L 1–7	Did not advance				
Steve Wijler	Men's individual	675	6	Naploszek (POL); W 6–4	Abdullin (KAZ); L 4–6	Did not advance				
Gijs Broeksma; Sjef van den Berg; Steve Wijler	Men's team	2012	2	—N/a		Bye	Great Britain; W 5–3	Chinese Taipei; L 0–6	Japan; L 4–5	4
Gabriela Schloesser	Women's individual	652	20	Gomboeva (ROC); W 6–5	Barbelin (FRA); L 0–6	Did not advance				
Steve Wijler; Gabriela Schloesser	Mixed team	1327	6 Q	—N/a		Italy; W 6–0	France; W 5–4	Turkey; W 5–3	South Korea; L 3–5	2nd place, silver medalist(s)

== Artistic swimming ==
The Netherlands fielded a squad of two artistic swimmers to compete in the women's duet event, by finishing fourth at the 2021 FINA Olympic Qualification Tournament in Barcelona, Spain.

Athlete	Event	Technical routine		Free routine (preliminary)			Free routine (final)		
Athlete	Event	Points	Rank	Points	Total (technical + free)	Rank	Points	Total (technical + free)	Rank
Bregje de Brouwer; Noortje de Brouwer	Duet	87.2612	9	88.1667	175.4279	9 Q	88.9000	176.1612	9

== Athletics ==
Dutch athletes further achieved the entry standards, either by qualifying time or by world ranking, in the following track and field events (up to a maximum of 3 athletes in each event):

Key

- Note–Ranks given for track events are within the athlete's heat only
- Q = Qualified for the next round
- q = Qualified for the next round as a fastest loser or, in field events, by position without achieving the qualifying target
- AR = Area (or continental) Record
- NR = National Record
- PB = Personal Best
- SB = Season Best
- N/A = Round not applicable for the event
- Bye = Athlete not required to compete in round

Track & road events
Men

Athlete	Event	Heat		Semifinal		Final	
Athlete	Event	Result	Rank	Result	Rank	Result	Rank
Taymir Burnet	200 m	20.60 SB	3 Q	20.90	8	Did not advance	
Liemarvin Bonevacia	400 m	44.95	1 Q	44.62 NR	3 q	45.07	8
Jochem Dobber	400 m	45.54	3 Q	45.48	6	Did not advance	
Tony van Diepen	800 m	1:46.03	6	Did not advance			
Mike Foppen	5000 m	DNF		—N/a		Did not advance	
Nick Smidt	400 m hurdles	49.55	4 Q	49.35 SB	7	Did not advance	
Taymir Burnet; Christopher Garia; Joris van Gool; Churandy Martina	4 × 100 m relay	DNF		—N/a		Did not advance	
Terrence Agard; Ramsey Angela; Liemarvin Bonevacia; Tony van Diepen; Jochem Dobber^{[a]}	4 × 400 m relay	2:59.06 NR	5 q	—N/a		2:57.18 NR	2nd place, silver medalist(s)
Khalid Choukoud	Marathon	—N/a				DNF	
Abdi Nageeye	Marathon	—N/a				2:09:58 SB	2nd place, silver medalist(s)
Bart van Nunen	Marathon	—N/a				DNF	

Women

Athlete	Event	Heat		Quarterfinal		Semifinal		Final	
Athlete	Event	Result	Rank	Result	Rank	Result	Rank	Result	Rank
Marije van Hunenstijn	100 m	Bye		11.27 SB	6	Did not advance			
Jamile Samuel	100 m	Bye		DNS		Did not advance			
Dafne Schippers	100 m	Bye		DNS		Did not advance			
Jamile Samuel	200 m	DNS		—N/a		Did not advance			
Dafne Schippers	200 m	23.13	3 Q	—N/a		23.03	6	Did not advance	
Lieke Klaver	400 m	51.37	3 Q	—N/a		51.37	6	Did not advance	
Lisanne de Witte	400 m	51.68 SB	4 q	—N/a		52.09	8	Did not advance	
Sifan Hassan	1500 m	4:05.17	1 Q	—N/a		4:00.23	1 Q	3:55.86	3rd place, bronze medalist(s)
Sifan Hassan	5000 m	14:47.89	1 Q	—N/a				14:36.79	1st place, gold medalist(s)
Sifan Hassan	10000 m	—N/a						29:55.32	1st place, gold medalist(s)
Diane van Es	5000 m	15:47.01	16	—N/a				Did not advance	
Susan Krumins	10000 m	—N/a						DNF	
Zoë Sedney	100 m hurdles	13.03	7	—N/a		Did not advance			
Nadine Visser	100 m hurdles	12.72 SB	2 Q	—N/a		12.63 SB	3 q	12.73	5
Femke Bol	400 m hurdles	54.43	1 Q	—N/a		53.91	1 Q	52.03 AR	3rd place, bronze medalist(s)
Irene van der Reijken	3000 m steeplechase	9:42.98	30	—N/a				Did not advance	
Marije van Hunenstijn; Dafne Schippers; Naomi Sedney; Nadine Visser	4 × 100 m relay	42.81 SB	5 q	—N/a				DNF	
Femke Bol; Laura de Witte; Lisanne de Witte; Lieke Klaver	4 × 400 m relay	3:24.01 NR	4 q	—N/a				3:23.74 NR	6
Andrea Deelstra	Marathon	—N/a						2:37:05	44
Jill Holterman	Marathon	—N/a						2:45:27	63

Mixed

Athlete	Event	Heat		Final	
Athlete	Event	Result	Rank	Result	Rank
Ramsey Angela; Liemarvin Bonevacia; Jochem Dobber^{[a]} Femke Bol; Lieke Klaver; Lisanne de Witte^{[a]}	4 × 400 m relay	3:10.69 NR	2 Q	3:10.36 NR	4

^{a} Athletes who participated in the heat only.

Field events

Athlete	Event	Qualification		Final	
Athlete	Event	Result	Rank	Result	Rank
Menno Vloon	Men's pole vault	5.75	7 q	5.55	13
Jessica Schilder	Women's shot put	17.74	19	Did not advance	
Jorinde van Klinken	Women's discus throw	61.15	14	Did not advance	

Combined events – Women's heptathlon

Athlete	Event	100H	HJ	SP	200 m	LJ	JT	800 m	Total	Rank
Nadine Broersen	Result	13.74	1.80 SB	14.50 SB	25.57 SB	DNS	—	—	DNF	
Nadine Broersen	Points	1015	978	827	835	0	—	—	DNF	
Emma Oosterwegel	Result	13.36 PB	1.80 PB	13.28	24.25 PB	6.29	54.60 PB	2:11.09 PB	6590 PB	3rd place, bronze medalist(s)
Emma Oosterwegel	Points	1071	978	746	957	940	949	949	6590 PB	3rd place, bronze medalist(s)
Anouk Vetter	Result	13.09 PB	1.80 SB	15.29 SB	23.81	6.47	51.20	2:18.72 SB	6689 NR	2nd place, silver medalist(s)
Anouk Vetter	Points	1111	978	880	999	997	883	841	6689 NR	2nd place, silver medalist(s)

== Badminton ==
The Netherlands entered 4 badminton players for the following events based on the BWF Race to Tokyo Rankings; one in the men's singles, one pair in the women's doubles and mixed doubles.

Athlete	Event	Group Stage				Elimination	Quarterfinal	Semifinal	Final / BM	
Athlete	Event	Opposition Score	Opposition Score	Opposition Score	Rank	Opposition Score	Opposition Score	Opposition Score	Opposition Score	Rank
Mark Caljouw	Men's singles	Zilberman (ISR); W (17–21, 21–9, 21–10)	Sai Praneeth (IND); W (21–14, 21–14)	—N/a	1 Q	Cordón (GUA); L (17–21, 21–3, 19–21)	Did not advance			
Selena Piek; Cheryl Seinen	Women's doubles	Honderich / Tsai (CAN); W (16–21, 21–14, 21–15)	Hany / Hosny (EGY); W (21–6, 21–10)	Matsumoto / Nagahara (JPN); L (22–24, 15–21)	2 Q	—N/a	Lee S-h / Shin S-c (KOR); L (8–21, 17–21)	Did not advance		
Robin Tabeling; Selena Piek	Mixed doubles	Choi S-g / Chae Y-j (KOR); L (21–16, 15–21, 11–21)	Zheng Sw / Huang Yq (CHN); L (15–21, 20–22)	Elgamal / Hany (EGY); W (21–9, 21–4)	3	—N/a	Did not advance			

== Basketball ==
Summary

Team	Event	Group stage								Quarterfinal	Semifinal	Final / BM	
Team	Event	Opposition Score	Opposition Score	Opposition Score	Opposition Score	Opposition Score	Opposition Score	Opposition Score	Rank	Opposition Score	Opposition Score	Opposition Score	Rank
Netherlands men's 3×3	Men's 3×3 tournament	Serbia; L 15–16	ROC; W 18–15	Japan; W 21–20	China; W 21–18	Belgium; L 17–18	Poland; W 22–20	Latvia; L 18–22	4 Q	ROC; L 19–21	Did not advance		5

=== 3x3 basketball ===
==== Men's tournament ====
Netherlands men's national 3x3 team qualified for the Olympics by securing a top three finish at the 2021 Olympic Qualifying Tournament.

Team roster

The players were announced on 6 July 2021.

- Ross Bekkering
- Dimeo van der Horst
- Arvin Slagter
- Jessey Voorn

Group play

Pos	Team	Pld	W	L	PF	PA	PD	Qualification
1	Serbia	7	7	0	138	91	+47	Semifinals
2	Belgium	7	4 (Note: Belgium 2–0, Latvia 1–1, Netherlands 0–2)	3	126	127	−1	Semifinals
3	Latvia	7	4	3	133	129	+4	Quarterfinals
4	Netherlands	7	4	3	132	129	+3	Quarterfinals
5	ROC	7	3	4	116	125	−9	Quarterfinals
6	Japan (H)	7	2 (Note: Japan 1–1, 123 PS; Poland 1–1, 120 PS; China 1–1, 119 PS)	5	123	134	−11	Quarterfinals
7	Poland	7	2	5	120	130	−10	
8	China	7	2	5	119	142	−23	

Source: TOCOG and FIBA
Rules for classification: 1) Wins; 2) Head-to-head record; 3) Points scored.
(H) Hosts
Notes:

24 July 2021
15:25
v

Report

Serbia	16–15	Netherlands
Pts: Vasić 5		Pts: Voorn 6

Aomi Urban Sports Park, Tokyo
Referees: Edmond Ho (HKG), Marek Maliszewski (POL)

24 July 2021
22:00
v

Report

Netherlands	18–15	ROC
Pts: Van der Horst 9		Pts: Karpenkov 6

Aomi Urban Sports Park, Tokyo
Referees: Jasmina Juras (SRB), Markos Michaelides (SUI)

25 July 2021
19:05
v

Report

Japan	20–21	Netherlands
Pts: Tominaga 10		Pts: Bekkering, Slagter 6

Aomi Urban Sports Park, Tokyo
Referees: Marek Maliszewski (POL), Vanessa Devlin (AUS)

25 July 2021
22:00
v

Report

Netherlands	21–18	China
Pts: Van der Horst 8		Pts: Hu 17

Aomi Urban Sports Park, Tokyo
Referees: Glenn Tuitt (USA), Jasmina Juras (SRB)

26 July 2021
18:40
v

Report

Netherlands	17–18 (OT)	Belgium
Pts: Voorn 10		Pts: Vervoort 7

Aomi Urban Sports Park, Tokyo
Referees: Markos Michaelides (SUI), Evgeny Ostrovskiy (RUS)

26 July 2021
22:25
v

Report

Netherlands	22–20 (OT)	Poland
Pts: Bekkering, Van der Horst 6		Pts: Hicks 8

Aomi Urban Sports Park, Tokyo
Referees: Markos Michaelides (SUI), Evgeny Ostrovskiy (RUS)

27 July 2021
18:25
v

Report

Latvia	22–18	Netherlands
Pts: Miezis 9		Pts: Van der Horst 8

Aomi Urban Sports Park, Tokyo
Referees: Edmond Ho (HKG), Jasmina Juras (SRB)

Quarterfinal

27 July 2021
21:00
v

Report

Netherlands	19–21	ROC
Pts: Van der Horst 8		Pts: Zuev 9

Aomi Urban Sports Park, Tokyo
Referees: Edmond Ho (HKG), Markos Michaelides (SUI)

== Boxing ==
The Netherlands entered two boxers (one per gender) into the Olympic tournament. Rio 2016 Olympians Enrico Lacruz (men's lightweight) and Nouchka Fontijn (women's middleweight) secured the spots on the Dutch squad in their respective weight divisions, either by winning the round of 16 match, advancing to the semifinal match, or scoring a box-off triumph, at the 2020 European Qualification Tournament in Villebon-sur-Yvette, France.

Athlete	Event	Round of 32	Round of 16	Quarterfinal	Semifinal	Final	
Athlete	Event	Opposition Result	Opposition Result	Opposition Result	Opposition Result	Opposition Result	Rank
Enrico Lacruz	Men's lightweight	Davis (USA); L 0–5	Did not advance				=17
Nouchka Fontijn	Women's middleweight	—N/a	Wójcik (POL); W 4–1	Thibeault (CAN); W 5–0	Price (GBR); L 2–3	Did not advance	3rd place, bronze medalist(s)

== Canoeing ==
=== Slalom ===
The Netherlands qualified one canoeist for the women's K-1 class by finishing in the top eighteen at the 2019 ICF Canoe Slalom World Championships in La Seu d'Urgell, Spain, marking the country's recurrence to the sport after a twelve-year absence.

Athlete	Event	Preliminary						Semifinal		Final	
Athlete	Event	Run 1	Rank	Run 2	Rank	Best	Rank	Time	Rank	Time	Rank
Martina Wegman	Women's K-1	113.29	12	109.84	10	109.84	12 Q	108.74	8 Q	111.33	7

== Cycling ==
=== Road ===
The Netherlands entered a squad of nine riders (five men and four women) to compete in their respective Olympic road races, by virtue of their top 50 national finish (for men) and top 22 (for women) in the UCI World Ranking.

Men

Athlete	Event	Time	Rank
Dylan van Baarle	Road race	6:09:04	15
Tom Dumoulin	Road race	6:15:38	44
Yoeri Havik	Road race	Did not finish	
Wilco Kelderman	Road race	6:15:38	51
Bauke Mollema	Road race	6:06:33	4
Tom Dumoulin	Time trial	56:05.58	2nd place, silver medalist(s)

Women

Athlete	Event	Time	Rank
Anna van der Breggen	Road race	3:54:31	15
Annemiek van Vleuten	Road race	3:54:00	2nd place, silver medalist(s)
Demi Vollering	Road race	3:55:41	25
Marianne Vos	Road race	3:54:31	5
Anna van der Breggen	Time trial	31:15.12	3rd place, bronze medalist(s)
Annemiek van Vleuten	Time trial	30:13.49	1st place, gold medalist(s)

=== Track ===
Following the completion of the 2020 UCI Track Cycling World Championships, Dutch riders accumulated spots for both men and women in team sprint, omnium, and madison, based on their country's results in the final UCI Olympic rankings. As a result of their place in the men's and women's team sprint, the Netherlands won its right to enter two riders in both men's and women's sprint and men's and women's keirin.

Sprint

Athlete	Event	Qualification		Round 1	Repechage 1	Round 2	Repechage 2	Round 3	Repechage 3	Quarterfinals	Semifinals	Final	
Athlete	Event	Time Speed (km/h)	Rank	Opposition Time Speed (km/h)	Opposition Time Speed (km/h)	Opposition Time Speed (km/h)	Opposition Time Speed (km/h)	Opposition Time Speed (km/h)	Opposition Time Speed (km/h)	Opposition Time	Opposition Time	Opposition Time	Rank
Jeffrey Hoogland	Men's sprint	9.215 OR; 78.133	1 Q	Mitchell (NZL); W 9.821; 73.312	Bye	Bötticher (GER); W 10.034; 71.756	Bye	Awang (MAS); W 9.831; 73.238	Bye	Vigier (FRA); W 10.204, W 9.902	Dmitriev (ROC); W 9.692, W 9.786	Lavreysen (NED); W 9.724, L, L	2nd place, silver medalist(s)
Harrie Lavreysen	Men's sprint	9.215; 78.133	2 Q	Sharom (MAS); W 10.005; 71.964	Bye	Tjon En Fa (SUR); W 9.766; 73.725	Bye	Sharom (MAS); W 9.635; 74.728	Bye	Kenny (GBR); W 10.243, W 10.551	Carlin (GBR); W 9.747, W 9.784	Hoogland (NED); L, W 9.776, W 10.681	1st place, gold medalist(s)
Shanne Braspennincx	Women's sprint	10.479; 68.709	7 Q	Bao Sj (CHN); W 10.979; 65.580	Bye	Zhong Ts (CHN); W 10.912; 65.982	Bye	Starikova (UKR); W 10.889; 66.122	Bye	Hinze (GER); L, L	Did not advance	5th place final Friedrich (GER); Genest (CAN); Marchant (GBR); L	7
Laurine van Riessen	Women's sprint	DNS		Did not advance									

Team sprint

Athlete	Event	Qualification		Round 1		Final	
Athlete	Event	Time Speed (km/h)	Rank	Opposition Time Speed (km/h)	Rank	Opposition Time Speed (km/h)	Rank
Roy van den Berg; Matthijs Büchli^{[a]} Jeffrey Hoogland; Harrie Lavreysen	Men's team sprint	42.134 OR; 64.081	1	Poland; W 41.431 OR; 65.169	1 FA	Great Britain; W 41.369 OR; 65.266	1st place, gold medalist(s)
Shanne Braspennincx; Laurine van Riessen	Women's team sprint	32.465 NR; 55.444	3	Poland; W 32.308 NR; 55.714	4 FB	ROC; L 32.504; 55.378	4

Qualification legend: FA=Gold medal final; FB=Bronze medal final
^{a} Athlete who participated in the qualification round only.

Keirin

Athlete	Event	Round 1	Repechage	Quarterfinal	Semifinal	Final
Athlete	Event	Rank	Rank	Rank	Rank	Rank
Matthijs Büchli	Men's keirin	3 R	3	Did not advance		=19
Harrie Lavreysen	Men's keirin	5 R	1 Q	4 Q	3 FA	3rd place, bronze medalist(s)
Shanne Braspennincx	Women's keirin	3 R	1 Q	1 Q	1 FA	1st place, gold medalist(s)
Laurine van Riessen	Women's keirin	1 Q	Bye	DNF	Did not advance	

Qualification legend: Q=Qualified for next round; R=Advanced to repechage

Omnium

Athlete	Event	Scratch race		Tempo race		Elimination race		Points race		Total points	Rank
Athlete	Event	Rank	Points	Rank	Points	Rank	Points	Rank	Points	Total points	Rank
Jan-Willem van Schip	Men's omnium	3	36	1	40	4	34	12	2	112	6
Kirsten Wild	Women's omnium	5	32	2	38	11	20	2	18	108	3rd place, bronze medalist(s)

Madison

Athlete	Event	Points	Lap	Rank
Yoeri Havik; Jan-Willem van Schip	Men's madison	17	0	5
Amy Pieters; Kirsten Wild	Women's madison	21	0	4

=== Mountain biking ===
Dutch mountain bikers qualified for two men's and two women's quota places into the Olympic cross-country race, as a result of the nation's fifth-place finish for men and third for women in the UCI Olympic Ranking List of 16 May 2021.

Athlete	Event	Time	Rank
Mathieu van der Poel	Men's cross-country	Did not finish	
Milan Vader	Men's cross-country	1:27:21	10
Anne Tauber	Women's cross-country	1:20.18	11
Anne Terpstra	Women's cross-country	1:18.21	5

=== BMX ===
The Netherlands received six quota spots (three per gender) for BMX at the Olympics, as a result of the nation's runner-up placement for men and top finish for women in the UCI Olympic Ranking List of June 1, 2021.

Athlete	Event	Quarterfinal		Semifinal		Final	
Athlete	Event	Points	Rank	Points	Rank	Result	Rank
Twan van Gendt	Men's race	5	2 Q	23	8	Did not advance	16
Joris Harmsen	Men's race	6	2 Q	18	7	Did not advance	13
Niek Kimmann	Men's race	4	1 Q	6	1 Q	39.053	1st place, gold medalist(s)
Judy Baauw	Women's race	7	2 Q	17	7	Did not advance	13
Laura Smulders	Women's race	4	1 Q	24	8	Did not advance	16
Merel Smulders	Women's race	10	3 Q	14	3 Q	44.721	3rd place, bronze medalist(s)

== Diving ==
The Netherlands entered two divers into the Olympic competition by finishing in the top twelve of their respective events at the 2019 FINA World Championships.

Athlete	Event	Preliminary		Semifinal		Final	
Athlete	Event	Points	Rank	Points	Rank	Points	Rank
Inge Jansen	Women's 3 m springboard	278.75	16 Q	301.90	9 Q	311.05	5
Celine van Duijn	Women's 10 m platform	306.80	11 Q	306.45	10 Q	287.70	10

== Equestrian ==
Dutch equestrians qualified a full squad each in the team dressage and jumping competitions by virtue of a top-six finish at the 2018 FEI World Equestrian Games in Tryon, North Carolina, United States. Meanwhile, two eventing spots were awarded to the Dutch equestrians, based on the results in the individual FEI Olympic rankings for Group A (North Western Europe).

Dutch equestrian squads for dressage, eventing and jumping were named on July 5, 2021.

=== Dressage ===
Dinja van Liere and Haute Couture have been named the travelling reserve.

Athlete	Horse	Event	Grand Prix		Grand Prix Special		Grand Prix Freestyle		Overall	
Athlete	Horse	Event	Score	Rank	Score	Rank	Technical	Artistic	Score	Rank
Marlies van Baalen	Go Legend	Individual	71.615	20	—N/a		Did not advance			20
Edward Gal	Total US	Individual	78.649	6 Q	—N/a		79.143	89.171	84.157	6
Hans Peter Minderhoud	Dream Boy	Individual	76.817	9 q	—N/a		75.536	85.829	80.682	12
Marlies van Baalen; Edward Gal; Hans Peter Minderhoud	See above	Team	7312.0	5 Q	7479.5	5	—N/a		7479.5	5

Qualification Legend: Q = Qualified for the final; q = Qualified for the final as a lucky loser

=== Eventing ===
Athlete	Horse	Event	Dressage		Cross-country			Jumping						Total	
Athlete	Horse	Event	Dressage		Cross-country			Qualifier			Final			Total	
Athlete	Horse	Event	Penalties	Rank	Penalties	Total	Rank	Penalties	Total	Rank	Penalties	Total	Rank	Penalties	Rank
Merel Blom	The Quizmaster	Individual	31.50	=21	Eliminated			Did not advance							
Janneke Boonzaaijer	Champ de Tailleur	Individual	33.00	30	Eliminated			Did not advance							

=== Jumping ===
Harrie Smolders and Bingo du Parc have been named the travelling reserve. They were entered as a substitution for the team final.

Athlete	Horse	Event	Qualification		Final			Jump-off		
Athlete	Horse	Event	Penalties	Rank	Penalties	Time	Rank	Penalties	Time	Rank
Willem Greve	Zypria S	Individual	4	=31	Did not advance					
Marc Houtzager	Dante	Individual	0	=1 Q	13	88.10	21	Did not advance		
Maikel van der Vleuten	Beauville Z	Individual	0	=1 Q	0	85.31	=1	0	38.90	3rd place, bronze medalist(s)
Willem Greve; Marc Houtzager; Harrie Smolders; Maikel van der Vleuten	Zypria S Dante; Bingo du Parc; Beauville Z	Team	26	9 Q	17	243.35	4	Did not advance		

== Fencing ==
The Netherlands entered one fencer into the Olympic competition. Set to compete at his fourth consecutive Games, Bas Verwijlen claimed a spot in the men's épée as one of the highest-ranked fencers vying for qualification from Europe in the FIE Adjusted Official Rankings.

Athlete	Event	Round of 64	Round of 32	Round of 16	Quarterfinal	Semifinal	Final / BM	
Athlete	Event	Opposition Score	Opposition Score	Opposition Score	Opposition Score	Opposition Score	Opposition Score	Rank
Bas Verwijlen	Men's épée	Bye	Kweon Y-j (KOR); W 15–10	Cannone (FRA); L 11–15	Did not advance			9

== Field hockey ==
Summary

Key:

- FT – After full time.
- P – Match decided by penalty-shootout.

Team	Event	Group Stage						Quarterfinal	Semifinal	Final / BM	
Team	Event	Opposition Score	Opposition Score	Opposition Score	Opposition Score	Opposition Score	Rank	Opposition Score	Opposition Score	Opposition Score	Rank
Netherlands men's	Men's tournament	Belgium; L 1–3	South Africa; W 5–3	Canada; W 4–2	Great Britain; D 2–2	Germany; L 1–3	4 Q	Australia; L 0–3^{P} FT: 2–2	Did not advance		6
Netherlands women's	Women's tournament	India; W 5–1	Ireland; W 4–0	South Africa; W 5–0	Great Britain; W 1–0	Germany; W 3–1	1 Q	New Zealand; W 3–0	Great Britain; W 5–1	Argentina; W 3–1	1st place, gold medalist(s)

=== Men's tournament ===
Netherlands men's national field hockey team qualified for the Olympics by securing one of the seven tickets available and defeating Pakistan in a two-legged playoff at the Amsterdam leg of the 2019 FIH Olympic Qualifiers.

Team roster

The squad was announced on 28 May 2021.

Head coach: (Argentina) Maximiliano Caldas

No.	Pos.	Player	Date of birth (age)	Caps	Goals	Club
2	FW	Jeroen Hertzberger	24 February 1986 (aged 35)	259	90	(Netherlands) Rotterdam
4	DF	Lars Balk	26 February 1996 (aged 25)	71	3	(Netherlands) Kampong
6	DF	Jonas de Geus	29 April 1998 (aged 23)	87	0	(Netherlands) Kampong
7	FW	Thijs van Dam	5 January 1997 (aged 24)	54	7	(Netherlands) Rotterdam
8	MF	Billy Bakker (Captain)	23 November 1988 (aged 32)	228	48	(Netherlands) Amsterdam
9	MF	Seve van Ass	10 April 1992 (aged 29)	182	25	(Netherlands) HGC
10	MF	Jorrit Croon	9 August 1998 (aged 22)	85	7	(Netherlands) Bloemendaal
11	MF	Glenn Schuurman	16 April 1991 (aged 30)	151	3	(Netherlands) Bloemendaal
12	DF	Sander de Wijn	2 May 1990 (aged 31)	154	6	(Netherlands) Kampong
14	MF	Robbert Kemperman	24 June 1990 (aged 31)	220	39	(Netherlands) Kampong
16	FW	Mirco Pruyser	11 August 1989 (aged 31)	134	72	(Netherlands) Amsterdam
17	FW	Roel Bovendeert	8 May 1992 (aged 29)	31	8	(Netherlands) Bloemendaal
23	DF	Joep de Mol	10 December 1995 (aged 25)	87	0	(Netherlands) Oranje-Rood
25	FW	Thierry Brinkman	19 March 1995 (aged 26)	111	38	(Netherlands) Bloemendaal
26	GK	Pirmin Blaak	8 March 1988 (aged 33)	106	0	(Netherlands) Oranje-Rood
27	DF	Jip Janssen	14 October 1997 (aged 23)	43	0	(Netherlands) Kampong
30	DF	Mink van der Weerden	19 December 1988 (aged 32)	183	100	(Germany) Rot-Weiss Köln
32	DF	Justen Blok	27 September 2000 (aged 20)	11	0	(Netherlands) Rotterdam

Group play

Pos	Team	Pld	W	D	L	GF	GA	GD	Pts	Qualification
1	Belgium	5	4	1	0	26	9	+17	13	Quarter-finals
2	Germany	5	3	0	2	19	10	+9	9	Quarter-finals
3	Great Britain	5	2	2	1	11	11	0	8	Quarter-finals
4	Netherlands	5	2	1	2	13	13	0	7	Quarter-finals
5	South Africa	5	1	1	3	16	24	−8	4	
6	Canada	5	0	1	4	9	27	−18	1	

Source: Tokyo 2020 and FIH
Rules for classification: 1) points; 2) matches won; 3) goal difference; 4) goals for; 5) head-to-head result; 6) field goals scored.

24 July 2021
11:45
v

Netherlands	1–3	Belgium
Hertzberger 35'	Report	Hendrickx 41', 44', 45'

North Pitch
Umpires:
Marcin Grochal (POL)
Adam Kearns (AUS)

25 July 2021
21:15
v

South Africa	3–5	Netherlands
M. Cassiem 2'; D. Cassiem 10'; Kok 18'	Report	Pruyser 24', 54'; Van Dam 29'; Brinkman 36'; Van der Weerden 48'

South Pitch
Umpires:
Jakub Mejzlík (CZE)
Javed Shaikh (IND)

27 July 2021
20:45
v

Netherlands	4–2	Canada
Bakker 1'; Brinkman 4'; De Mol 50'; Pruyser 60'	Report	Wallace 10'; Tupper 53'

North Pitch
Umpires:
Javed Shaikh (IND)
David Tomlinson (NZL)

29 July 2021
12:15
v

Netherlands	2–2	Great Britain
Brinkman 22'; Janssen 31'	Report	Ward 52', 57'

South Pitch
Umpires:
Raghu Prasad (IND)
Germán Montes de Oca (ARG)

30 July 2021
20:45
v

Germany	3–1	Netherlands
Wellen 10'; Staib 41'; Herzbruch 54'	Report	Hertzberger 57'

North Pitch
Umpires:
Marcin Grochal (POL)
Adam Kearns (AUS)

Quarterfinal

1 August 2021
12:00
v

Australia	2–2	Netherlands
Wickham 13', 38'	Report	Van der Weerden 32'; Hertzberger 50'
Penalties
Govers (penalty shoot-out scored); Ogilvie (penalty shoot-out scored); Brand (penalty shoot-out scored)	3–0	(penalty shoot-out missed) Hertzberger; (penalty shoot-out missed) Kemperman; (penalty shoot-out missed) De Geus

Umpires:
Ben Göntgen (GER)
Germán Montes de Oca (ARG)

=== Women's tournament ===
Netherlands women's national field hockey team qualified for the Games by winning the gold medal at the 2019 EuroHockey Nations Championships in Antwerp, Belgium.

Team roster

The squad was announced on 16 June 2021.

Head coach: (Australia) Alyson Annan

No.	Pos.	Player	Date of birth (age)	Caps	Goals	Club
3	DF	Sanne Koolen	23 March 1996 (aged 25)	49	0	(Netherlands) Den Bosch
4	DF	Freeke Moes	29 November 1998 (aged 22)	7	1	(Netherlands) Amsterdam
5	MF	Malou Pheninckx	24 July 1991 (aged 30)	100	3	(Netherlands) Kampong
6	MF	Laurien Leurink	13 November 1994 (aged 26)	113	26	(Netherlands) SCHC
7	MF	Xan de Waard	8 November 1995 (aged 25)	156	16	(Netherlands) SCHC
8	MF	Marloes Keetels	4 May 1993 (aged 28)	157	23	(Netherlands) Den Bosch
10	MF	Felice Albers	27 December 1999 (aged 21)	10	7	(Netherlands) Amsterdam
11	FW	Maria Verschoor	22 April 1994 (aged 27)	144	20	(Netherlands) Amsterdam
12	FW	Lidewij Welten	16 July 1990 (aged 31)	217	86	(Netherlands) Den Bosch
13	DF	Caia van Maasakker	5 April 1989 (aged 32)	204	66	(Netherlands) SCHC
15	FW	Frédérique Matla	28 December 1996 (aged 24)	82	55	(Netherlands) Den Bosch
18	DF	Pien Sanders	11 June 1998 (aged 23)	63	1	(Netherlands) Den Bosch
20	MF	Laura Nunnink	26 January 1995 (aged 26)	131	2	(Netherlands) Den Bosch
21	DF	Lauren Stam	30 January 1994 (aged 27)	97	8	(Netherlands) Amsterdam
22	GK	Josine Koning	2 September 1995 (aged 25)	78	0	(Netherlands) Den Bosch
23	DF	Margot van Geffen	23 November 1989 (aged 31)	210	15	(Netherlands) Den Bosch
24	MF	Eva de Goede (Captain)	23 March 1989 (aged 32)	241	32	(Netherlands) Amsterdam
29	DF	Stella van Gils	4 August 1999 (aged 21)	6		(Netherlands) Pinoké

Group play

Pos	Team	Pld	W	D	L	GF	GA	GD	Pts	Qualification
1	Netherlands	5	5	0	0	18	2	+16	15	Quarterfinals
2	Germany	5	4	0	1	13	7	+6	12	Quarterfinals
3	Great Britain	5	3	0	2	11	5	+6	9	Quarterfinals
4	India	5	2	0	3	7	14	−7	6	Quarterfinals
5	Ireland	5	1	0	4	4	11	−7	3	
6	South Africa	5	0	0	5	5	19	−14	0	

Source: Tokyo 2020 and FIH
Rules for classification: 1) points; 2) matches won; 3) goal difference; 4) goals for; 5) head-to-head result; 6) field goals scored.

24 July 2021
20:45
v

Netherlands	5–1	India
Albers 6', 43'; Van Geffen 33'; Matla 45'; Van Maasakker 52'	Report	Rani 10'

North Pitch
Umpires:
Carolina de la Fuente (ARG)
Amber Church (NZL)

26 July 2021
10:00
v

Netherlands	4–0	Ireland
Albers 8'; Pheninckx 49'; Leurink 50'; Matla 56'	Report

South Pitch
Umpires:
Michelle Meister (GER)
Liu Xiaoying (CHN)

28 July 2021
09:30
v

Netherlands	5–0	South Africa
Matla 16', 35'; Keetels 42'; Albers 52'; Verschoor 55'	Report

North Pitch
Umpires:
Amber Church (NZL)
Ayanna McClean (TTO)

29 July 2021
19:00
v

Great Britain	0–1	Netherlands
	Report	Matla 13'

South Pitch
Umpires:
Michelle Joubert (RSA)
Aleisha Neumann (AUS)

31 July 2021
18:30
v

Germany	1–3	Netherlands
Zimmermann 23'	Report	Matla 8', 56'; Welten 14'

North Pitch
Umpires:
Irene Presenqui (ARG)
Kelly Hudson (NZL)

Quarterfinal

2 August 2021
18:30
v

Netherlands	3–0	New Zealand
Welten 7'; Matla 21'; Stam 37'	Report

Umpires:
Michelle Meister (GER)
Michelle Joubert (RSA)

Semifinal

4 August 2021
10:30
v

Netherlands	5–1	Great Britain
Albers 19', 38'; Keetels 18'; Verschoor 32'; Matla 49'	Report	Ansley 41'

Umpires:
Michelle Joubert (RSA)
Laurine Delforge (BEL)

Gold medal game

6 August 2021
19:00
v

(gold) Netherlands	3–1	Argentina (silver)
Van Geffen 23'; Van Maasakker 26', 29'	Report	Gorzelany 30+'

Umpires:
Laurine Delforge (BEL)
Sarah Wilson (GBR)

== Football ==
Summary

Key:

- a.e.t. – After extra time.
- P – Match decided by penalty-shootout.

Team	Event	Group Stage				Quarterfinal	Semifinal	Final / BM	
Team	Event	Opposition Score	Opposition Score	Opposition Score	Rank	Opposition Score	Opposition Score	Opposition Score	Rank
Netherlands women's	Women's tournament	Zambia; W 10–3	Brazil; D 3–3	China; W 8–2	1 Q	United States; L 2–4^{P} 2–2 (a.e.t.)	Did not advance		5

=== Women's tournament ===
Netherlands women's national football team qualified for the Games by securing a top-three finish at the 2019 FIFA Women's World Cup in France, defeating the Italians in the quarterfinal round to reach the country's first women's Olympic tournament.

Team roster

The final squad of 22 athletes was announced on 16 June 2021. On 20 July 2021, Joëlle Smits replaced Sherida Spitse due to injury.

Head coach: Sarina Wiegman

No.	Pos.	Player	Date of birth (age)	Caps	Goals	Club
1	GK	Sari van Veenendaal (captain)	3 April 1990 (aged 31)	74	0	(Royal Dutch Football Association) PSV
2	DF	Lynn Wilms	3 October 2000 (aged 20)	12	1	(Royal Dutch Football Association) FC Twente
3	DF	Stefanie van der Gragt	16 August 1992 (aged 28)	75	10	(Royal Dutch Football Association) Ajax
4	DF	Aniek Nouwen	9 March 1999 (aged 22)	16	1	(Royal Dutch Football Association) PSV
5	DF	Merel van Dongen	11 February 1993 (aged 28)	51	1	(Royal Spanish Football Federation) Atlético Madrid
6	MF	Jill Roord	22 April 1997 (aged 24)	64	11	(The Football Association) Arsenal
7	FW	Shanice van de Sanden	2 October 1992 (aged 28)	85	19	(German Football Association) VfL Wolfsburg
8	FW	Joëlle Smits	7 February 2000 (aged 21)	4	0	(Royal Dutch Football Association) PSV
9	FW	Vivianne Miedema	15 July 1996 (aged 25)	96	73	(The Football Association) Arsenal
10	MF	Daniëlle van de Donk	5 August 1991 (aged 29)	114	28	(The Football Association) Arsenal
11	FW	Lieke Martens	16 December 1992 (aged 28)	123	49	(Royal Spanish Football Federation) Barcelona
12	FW	Sisca Folkertsma	21 May 1997 (aged 24)	12	0	(Royal Dutch Football Association) FC Twente
13	MF	Victoria Pelova	3 June 1999 (aged 22)	11	0	(Royal Dutch Football Association) Ajax
14	MF	Jackie Groenen	17 December 1994 (aged 26)	71	7	(The Football Association) Manchester United
15	DF	Kika van Es	11 October 1991 (aged 29)	70	0	(Royal Dutch Football Association) FC Twente
16	GK	Lize Kop	17 March 1998 (aged 23)	6	0	(Royal Dutch Football Association) Ajax
17	DF	Dominique Janssen	17 January 1995 (aged 26)	71	2	(German Football Association) VfL Wolfsburg
18	FW	Lineth Beerensteyn	11 October 1996 (aged 24)	66	12	(German Football Association) Bayern Munich
19	FW	Renate Jansen	7 December 1990 (aged 30)	48	4	(Royal Dutch Football Association) FC Twente
20	MF	Inessa Kaagman	17 April 1996 (aged 25)	11	0	(The Football Association) Brighton & Hove Albion
21	DF	Anouk Dekker	15 November 1986 (aged 34)	86	7	(French Football Federation) Montpellier
22	GK	Loes Geurts	12 January 1986 (aged 35)	125	0	(Swedish Football Association) BK Häcken

Group play

Pos	Team	Pld	W	D	L	GF	GA	GD	Pts	Qualification
1	Netherlands	3	2	1	0	21	8	+13	7	Advance to knockout stage
2	Brazil	3	2	1	0	9	3	+6	7	Advance to knockout stage
3	Zambia	3	0	1	2	7	15	−8	1	
4	China	3	0	1	2	6	17	−11	1	

Source: TOCOG and FIFA
Rules for classification: Group stage tiebreakers
21 July 2021
20:00

Zambia	3–10	Netherlands
Banda 19', 82', 83'	Report (TOCOG); Report (FIFA)	Miedema 9', 15', 29', 59'; Martens 14', 38'; Van de Sanden 44'; Roord 64'; Beerensteyn 75'; Pelova 80'

Miyagi Stadium, Rifu
Attendance: 1,822
Referee: Laura Fortunato (Argentina)

24 July 2021
20:00

Netherlands	3–3	Brazil
Miedema 3', 59'; Janssen 79'	Report (TOCOG); Report (FIFA)	Debinha 16'; Marta 65' (pen.); Ludmila 68'

Miyagi Stadium, Rifu
Attendance: 2,621
Referee: Kate Jacewicz (Australia)

27 July 2021
20:30

Netherlands	8–2	China
Van de Sanden 12'; Beerensteyn 37', 45+2'; Martens 47', 70'; Miedema 65', 76'; Pelova 71'	Report (TOCOG); Report (FIFA)	Wang Shanshan 28'; Wang Yanwen 69'

International Stadium Yokohama, Yokohama
Attendance: 0
Referee: Salima Mukansanga (Rwanda)

Quarterfinal

30 July 2021
20:00

Netherlands	2–2 (a.e.t.)	United States
Miedema 18', 54'	Report (TOCOG); Report (FIFA)	S. Mewis 28'; Williams 31'
Penalties
Miedema (penalty missed); Janssen (penalty scored); Van der Gragt (penalty scored); Nouwen (penalty missed)	2–4	(penalty scored) Lavelle; (penalty scored) Morgan; (penalty scored) Press; (penalty scored) Rapinoe

International Stadium Yokohama, Yokohama
Attendance: 0
Referee: Kate Jacewicz (Australia)

== Golf ==
Athlete	Event	Round 1	Round 2	Round 3	Round 4	Total		
Athlete	Event	Score	Score	Score	Score	Score	Par	Rank
Anne van Dam	Women's	74	78	69	77	298	+14	57

== Gymnastics ==
=== Artistic ===
The Netherlands fielded a full squad of five gymnasts (one man and four women) into the Olympic competition. The women's squad claimed one of the remaining nine spots in the team all-around, while an additional berth was awarded to a lone Dutch male gymnast, who competed in the individual all-around and apparatus events at the 2019 World Artistic Gymnastics Championships in Stuttgart, Germany.

Men

Athlete	Event	Qualification								Final							
Athlete	Event	Apparatus						Total	Rank	Apparatus						Total	Rank
Athlete	Event	F	PH	R	V	PB	HB	Total	Rank	F	PH	R	V	PB	HB	Total	Rank
Bart Deurloo	Horizontal bar	—N/a					14.400	14.400	8 Q	—N/a					12.266	12.266	7
Epke Zonderland	Horizontal bar	—N/a					13.833	13.833	23	Did not advance							

Women
Team

Athlete	Event	Qualification						Final					
Athlete	Event	Apparatus				Total	Rank	Apparatus				Total	Rank
Athlete	Event	V	UB	BB	F	Total	Rank	V	UB	BB	F	Total	Rank
Vera van Pol	Team	14.100	13.133	11.600	12.900	51.733	47	Did not advance					
Eythora Thorsdottir	Team	14.433	13.000	12.333	13.133	52.899	36	Did not advance					
Lieke Wevers	Team	13.600	13.533	13.366	12.866	53.365	32 R1^{[a]}	Did not advance					
Sanne Wevers	Team	—N/a	11.733	13.866	—N/a			Did not advance					
Total	Team	42.133	39.666	39.565	38.899	160.263	11	Did not advance					

Individual

Athlete	Event	Qualification						Final					
Athlete	Event	Apparatus				Total	Rank	Apparatus				Total	Rank
Athlete	Event	V	UB	BB	F	Total	Rank	V	UB	BB	F	Total	Rank
Lieke Wevers	All-around	See team results						13.266	13.366	12.400	12.066	51.098	24

Qualification legend: Q=Qualified for final; R1=First reserve
^{a} Qualified for final after withdrawal of another athlete.

== Handball ==
Summary

Key:

- ET – After extra time
- P – Match decided by penalty-shootout.

Team	Event	Group Stage						Quarterfinal	Semifinal	Final / BM	
Team	Event	Opposition Score	Opposition Score	Opposition Score	Opposition Score	Opposition Score	Rank	Opposition Score	Opposition Score	Opposition Score	Rank
Netherlands women's	Women's tournament	Japan; W 32–21	South Korea; W 43–36	Angola; W 37–28	Norway; L 27–29	Montenegro; W 30–29	2 Q	France; L 22–32	Did not advance		5

=== Women's tournament ===
Netherlands women's national handball team qualified for the Olympics by winning the gold medal and securing an outright berth at the final match of the 2019 World Championships in Kumamoto.

Team roster

The squad was announced on 30 June 2021.

Head coach: (France) Emmanuel Mayonnade

No.	Pos.	Name	Date of birth (age)	Height	App.	Goals	Club
6	RB	Laura van der Heijden	27 June 1990 (aged 31)	1.72 m	222	683	(Germany) Borussia Dortmund
7	RW	Debbie Bont	9 December 1990 (aged 30)	1.75 m	177	348	(France) Metz Handball
8	LB	Lois Abbingh	13 August 1992 (aged 28)	1.77 m	161	724	(Denmark) Odense Håndbold
9	CB	Larissa Nüsser	8 February 2000 (aged 21)	1.75 m	37	40	(Denmark) København Håndbold
10	P	Danick Snelder	22 May 1990 (aged 31)	1.78 m	183	438	(Germany) SG BBM Bietigheim
12	LW	Bo van Wetering	10 May 1999 (aged 22)	1.72 m	24	57	(Denmark) Odense Håndbold
17	CB	Nycke Groot	4 May 1988 (aged 33)	1.75 m	141	439	Not attached
18	LB	Kelly Dulfer	21 March 1994 (aged 27)	1.85 m	124	152	(Germany) SG BBM Bietigheim
19	P	Merel Freriks	6 January 1998 (aged 23)	1.75 m	40	37	(Germany) Borussia Dortmund
20	LB	Inger Smits	17 September 1994 (aged 26)	1.79 m	38	30	(Germany) SG BBM Bietigheim
24	LW	Martine Smeets	5 May 1990 (aged 31)	1.72 m	117	144	(Romania) CSM București
26	RW	Angela Malestein	31 January 1993 (aged 28)	1.70 m	154	353	(Hungary) FTC Rail-Cargo Hungaria
30	GK	Rinka Duijndam	6 August 1997 (aged 23)	1.78 m	36	0	(Germany) Thüringer HC
33	GK	Tess Wester	19 May 1993 (aged 28)	1.78 m	116	10	(Romania) CSM București
48	RB	Dione Housheer	26 September 1999 (aged 21)	1.80 m	31	55	(Denmark) Odense Håndbold

Group play

Pos	Team	Pld	W	D	L	GF	GA	GD	Pts	Qualification
1	Norway	5	5	0	0	170	123	+47	10	Quarter-finals
2	Netherlands	5	4	0	1	169	143	+26	8	Quarter-finals
3	Montenegro	5	2	0	3	139	142	−3	4	Quarter-finals
4	South Korea	5	1	1	3	147	165	−18	3 (Note: South Korea 31–31 Angola)	Quarter-finals
5	Angola	5	1	1	3	130	156	−26	3	
6	Japan (H)	5	1	0	4	124	150	−26	2	

Source: Tokyo 2020 and IHF
Rules for classification: 1) Points; 2) Head-to-head points; 3) Head-to-head goal difference; 4) Head-to-head goals scored; 5) Goal difference; 6) Goals scored; 7) Draw.
(H) Hosts
Notes:

25 July 2021; 09:00	Netherlands	32–21	Japan	Yoyogi National Gymnasium, Tokyo; Referees: García, Paolantoni (ARG)
25 July 2021; 09:00	Abbingh 7	(18–10)	Fujii 5	Yoyogi National Gymnasium, Tokyo; Referees: García, Paolantoni (ARG)
25 July 2021; 09:00	2× (suspension)	Report	1× (yellow card) 3× (suspension)	Yoyogi National Gymnasium, Tokyo; Referees: García, Paolantoni (ARG)

27 July 2021; 16:15	South Korea	36–43	Netherlands	Yoyogi National Gymnasium, Tokyo; Referees: Lah, Sok (SLO)
27 July 2021; 16:15	Ryu 10	(15–19)	Abbingh 6	Yoyogi National Gymnasium, Tokyo; Referees: Lah, Sok (SLO)
27 July 2021; 16:15	1× (yellow card) 2× (suspension)	Report	2× (yellow card) 7× (suspension)	Yoyogi National Gymnasium, Tokyo; Referees: Lah, Sok (SLO)

29 July 2021; 09:00	Netherlands	37–28	Angola	Yoyogi National Gymnasium, Tokyo; Referees: El-Saied, El-Saied (EGY)
29 July 2021; 09:00	Van Wetering 7	(17–15)	Guialo 8	Yoyogi National Gymnasium, Tokyo; Referees: El-Saied, El-Saied (EGY)
29 July 2021; 09:00	1× (yellow card) 1× (suspension) 1× (red card)	Report	5× (suspension)	Yoyogi National Gymnasium, Tokyo; Referees: El-Saied, El-Saied (EGY)

31 July 2021; 21:30	Norway	29–27	Netherlands	Yoyogi National Gymnasium, Tokyo; Referees: Alpaidze, Berezkina (RUS)
31 July 2021; 21:30	Mørk 9	(16–13)	Smits 7	Yoyogi National Gymnasium, Tokyo; Referees: Alpaidze, Berezkina (RUS)
31 July 2021; 21:30	2× (suspension)	Report	3× (suspension)	Yoyogi National Gymnasium, Tokyo; Referees: Alpaidze, Berezkina (RUS)

2 August 2021; 19:30	Netherlands	30–29	Montenegro	Yoyogi National Gymnasium, Tokyo; Referees: Fonseca, Santos (POR)
2 August 2021; 19:30	Van der Heijden 5	(17–12)	Radičević 8	Yoyogi National Gymnasium, Tokyo; Referees: Fonseca, Santos (POR)
2 August 2021; 19:30	1× (yellow card) 5× (suspension)	Report	2× (yellow card) 3× (suspension)	Yoyogi National Gymnasium, Tokyo; Referees: Fonseca, Santos (POR)

Quarterfinal

4 August 2021; 20:45	France	32–22	Netherlands	Yoyogi National Gymnasium, Tokyo; Referees: Hansen, Madsen (DEN)
4 August 2021; 20:45	Flippes 6	(19–11)	Malestein 5	Yoyogi National Gymnasium, Tokyo; Referees: Hansen, Madsen (DEN)
4 August 2021; 20:45	1× (suspension)	Report	4× (suspension)	Yoyogi National Gymnasium, Tokyo; Referees: Hansen, Madsen (DEN)

== Judo ==
Men

Athlete	Event	Round of 64	Round of 32	Round of 16	Quarterfinal	Semifinal	Repechage	Final / BM	
Athlete	Event	Opposition Result	Opposition Result	Opposition Result	Opposition Result	Opposition Result	Opposition Result	Opposition Result	Rank
Tornike Tsjakadoea	−60 kg	—N/a	Dashdavaa (MGL); W 01–00	Mshvidobadze (ROC); W 01–00	Yang Y-w (TPE); L 00–10	Did not advance	Lesiuk (UKR); W 10–00	Smetov (KAZ); L 00–01	=5
Frank de Wit	−81 kg	Bye	Percival (SAM); W 10–00	Ressel (GER); L 00–01	Did not advance				
Noël van 't End	−90 kg	Bye	Persoglia (SMR); W 10–00	Clerget (FRA); W 01–00	Žgank (TUR); L 00–10	Did not advance	Tóth (HUN); L 00–01	Did not advance	=7
Michael Korrel	−100 kg	—N/a	Bye	Frey (GER); L 00–01	Did not advance				
Henk Grol	+100 kg	—N/a	Bye	Oltiboev (UZB); L 00–10	Did not advance				

Women

Athlete	Event	Round of 32	Round of 16	Quarterfinal	Semifinal	Repechage	Final / BM	
Athlete	Event	Opposition Result	Opposition Result	Opposition Result	Opposition Result	Opposition Result	Opposition Result	Rank
Sanne Verhagen	−57 kg	Filzmoser (AUT); W 10–00	Gjakova (KOS); L 00–01	Did not advance				
Juul Franssen	−63 kg	Obradović (SRB); W 10–00	Haecker (AUS); W 10–00	Agbegnenou (FRA); L 00–01	Did not advance	Quadros (BRA); W 10–00	Centracchio (ITA); L 00–10	=5
Sanne van Dijke	−70 kg	bye	Matniyazova (UZB); W 10–00	Bellandi (ITA); W 11–01	Polleres (AUT); L 00–01	Bye	Scoccimarro (GER); W 10–00	3rd place, bronze medalist(s)
Guusje Steenhuis	−78 kg	Bye	Turchyn (UKR); W 01–00	Yoon H-j (KOR); L 00–01	Did not advance	Antomarchi (CUB); L 00–10	Did not advance	=7
Tessie Savelkouls	+78 kg	Han M-j (KOR); L 00–01	Did not advance					

Mixed

Athlete	Event	Round of 16	Quarterfinal	Semifinal	Repechage	Final / BM	
Athlete	Event	Opposition Result	Opposition Result	Opposition Result	Opposition Result	Opposition Result	Rank
Noël van 't End; Henk Grol; Michael Korrel; Tornike Tsjakadoea; Sanne van Dijke; Guusje Steenhuis; Sanne Verhagen	Team	Uzbekistan; W 4–3	Brazil; W 4–2	France; L 0–4	Bye	Germany; L 2–4	=5

== Rowing ==
The Netherlands qualified twelve out of fourteen boats for each of the following rowing classes into the Olympic regatta, with the majority of crews confirming Olympic places for their boats at the 2019 FISA World Championships in Ottensheim, Austria. Meanwhile, the women's coxless pair rowers were added to the Dutch roster with their top-two finish at the 2021 FISA Final Qualification Regatta in Lucerne, Switzerland.

Men

Athlete	Event	Heat		Repechage		Quarterfinal		Semifinal		Final	
Athlete	Event	Time	Rank	Time	Rank	Time	Rank	Time	Rank	Time	Rank
Finn Florijn	Single sculls	7:04.56	4 R	DNS		Withdrew due to positive COVID-19 test					
Stef Broenink; Melvin Twellaar	Double sculls	6:08.38 OR	1 SA/B	Bye		—N/a		6:20.17	1 FA	6:00.53	2nd place, silver medalist(s)
Guillaume Krommenhoek; Niki van Sprang	Pair	6:36.42	2 SA/B	Bye		—N/a		6:19.57	4 FB	6:22.75	7
Jan van der Bij; Sander de Graaf; Nelson Ritsema; Boudewijn Röell	Four	6:00.27	3 R	6:11.22	2 FA	—N/a				5:50.81	6
Koen Metsemakers; Dirk Uittenbogaard; Abe Wiersma; Tone Wieten	Quadruple sculls	5:39.80	1 FA	Bye		—N/a				5:32.03	1st place, gold medalist(s)
Eline Berger (cox); Simon van Dorp; Bjorn van den Ende; Maarten Hurkmans; Ruben Knab; Robert Lücken; Bram Schwarz; Jasper Tissen; Mechiel Versluis	Eight	5:30.66	1 FA	Bye		—N/a				5:27.96	5

Women

Athlete	Event	Heat		Repechage		Quarterfinal		Semifinal		Final	
Athlete	Event	Time	Rank	Time	Rank	Time	Rank	Time	Rank	Time	Rank
Sophie Souwer	Single sculls	7:39.96	2 QF	Bye		7:59.92	2 SA/B	7:29.66	4 FB	7:25.96	7
Roos de Jong; Lisa Scheenaard	Double sculls	6:49.90	1 SA/B	Bye		—N/a		7:08.09	1 FA	6:45.73	3rd place, bronze medalist(s)
Marieke Keijser; Ilse Paulis	Lightweight double sculls	7:07.73	1 SA/B	Bye		—N/a		6:43.85	3 FA	6:48.03	3rd place, bronze medalist(s)
Ymkje Clevering; Karolien Florijn; Ellen Hogerwerf; Veronique Meester	Four	6:33.47	1 FA	Bye		—N/a				6:15.71	2nd place, silver medalist(s)
Nicole Beukers; Inge Janssen; Olivia van Rooijen; Laila Youssifou	Quadruple sculls	6:19.36	2 FA	Bye		—N/a				6:15.75	6

Qualification Legend: FA=Final A (medal); FB=Final B (non-medal); FC=Final C (non-medal); FD=Final D (non-medal); FE=Final E (non-medal); FF=Final F (non-medal); OB=Olympic best time; SA/B=Semifinals A/B; SC/D=Semifinals C/D; SE/F=Semifinals E/F; QF=Quarterfinals; R=Repechage

== Sailing ==
Dutch sailors qualified one boat in each of the following classes through the 2018 Sailing World Championships, the class-associated Worlds, and the continental regattas.

At the end of the European Championships (2019 and 2020), nine sailors were officially named to the Dutch team for Tokyo 2021, including reigning Olympic champion Marit Bouwmeester, world skiff champions Annemiek Bekkering and Annette Duetz, and Finn yachtsman Nicholas Heiner, who beat triple Olympian Pieter-Jan Postma for the top spot in the selection stage. Meanwhile, windsurfer Kiran Badloe overthrew his countryman and two-time defending champion Dorian van Rijsselberghe to take the men's RS:X spot at the 2020 Worlds, joining with the rest of the Dutch team on his Olympic debut in Tokyo.

Men

Athlete	Event	Race													Net points	Final rank
Athlete	Event	1	2	3	4	5	6	7	8	9	10	11	12	M*	Net points	Final rank
Kiran Badloe	RS:X	5	7	1	1	~~26~~	5	2	4	1	5	1	1	4	37	1st place, gold medalist(s)
Nicholas Heiner	Finn	~~11~~	5	10	2	4	2	10	3	7	9	—N/a		4	56	4
Bart Lambriex; Pim van Vugt	49er	~~14~~	2	3	7	6	7	13	14	7	6	7	3	12	87	6

Women

Athlete	Event	Race													Net points	Final rank
Athlete	Event	1	2	3	4	5	6	7	8	9	10	11	12	M*	Net points	Final rank
Lilian de Geus	RS:X	8	~~11~~	1	8	3	11	3	4	4	9	5	4	12	72	5
Marit Bouwmeester	Laser Radial	21	14	7	2	3	9	~~45~~	7	1	7	—N/a		12	83	3rd place, bronze medalist(s)
Lobke Berkhout; Afrodite Zegers	470	10	11	14	11	9	6	~~17~~	6	4	2	—N/a		18	91	10
Annemiek Bekkering; Annette Duetz	49er FX	13	8	2	1	6	1	12	5	6	5	11	~~16~~	18	88	3rd place, bronze medalist(s)

M = Medal race; EL = Eliminated – did not advance into the medal race

== Skateboarding ==
The Netherlands qualified three skateboarders in the women's street event at the Games based on the Olympic World Skateboarding Rankings List of 30 June 2021.

Athlete	Event	Qualification		Final	
Athlete	Event	Points	Rank	Points	Rank
Candy Jacobs	Women's street	Withdrew due to positive COVID-19 test			
Keet Oldenbeuving	Women's street	8.70	12	Did not advance	
Roos Zwetsloot	Women's street	13.48	4 Q	11.26	5

== Swimming ==
Dutch swimmers further achieved qualifying standards in the following events (up to a maximum of 2 swimmers in each event at the Olympic Qualifying Time (OQT), and potentially 1 at the Olympic Selection Time (OST)): To assure their selection to the Olympic team, swimmers must attain a time equal to or faster than the twelfth-placed mark in the semifinals of their respective individual pool events at the 2019 FINA World Championships, while racing at one of the following meets: Swim Cup Amsterdam (13–15 December 2019), two stages of the Dutch Open Championships (first – 3–6 December 2020; second – 25–27 June 2021), and LEN Swimming Cup (9–11 April 2021).

Men

Athlete	Event	Heat		Semifinal		Final	
Athlete	Event	Time	Rank	Time	Rank	Time	Rank
Thom de Boer	50 m freestyle	21.75	6 Q	21.78	8 Q	21.79	8
Caspar Corbeau	100 m breaststroke	1:00.13	25	Did not advance			
Caspar Corbeau	200 m breaststroke	2:10.21	21	Did not advance			
Arno Kamminga	100 m breaststroke	57.80 NR	2 Q	58.19	2 Q	58.00	2nd place, silver medalist(s)
Arno Kamminga	200 m breaststroke	2:07.37	=1 Q	2:07.99	3 Q	2:07.01	2nd place, silver medalist(s)
Arjan Knipping	200 m individual medley	1:59.44 NR	=30	Did not advance			
Arjan Knipping	400 m individual medley	4:15.83	17	—N/a		Did not advance	
Nyls Korstanje	100 m butterfly	51.54 NR	11 Q	51.80	12	Did not advance	
Stan Pijnenburg	100 m freestyle	48.53	21	Did not advance			
Jesse Puts	50 m freestyle	21.84	7 Q	21.87	=12	Did not advance	
Ferry Weertman	10 km open water	—N/a				1:51:30.8	7
Thom de Boer; Nyls Korstanje; Stan Pijnenburg; Jesse Puts	4 × 100 m freestyle relay	3:14.07	12	—N/a		Did not advance	

Women

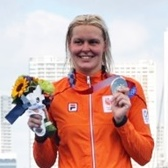
Sharon van Rouwendaal won the silver medal

Athlete	Event	Heat		Semifinal		Final	
Athlete	Event	Time	Rank	Time	Rank	Time	Rank
Femke Heemskerk	50 m freestyle	24.77	16 Q	DNS		Did not advance	
Femke Heemskerk	100 m freestyle	53.10	9 Q	52.93	6 Q	52.79	6
Ranomi Kromowidjojo	50 m freestyle	24.41	8 Q	24.29	7 Q	24.30	4
Ranomi Kromowidjojo	100 m freestyle	53.71	=16 QSO^{[a]}	Did not advance			
Sharon van Rouwendaal	200 m backstroke	2:11.24	16 Q	2:12.98	16	Did not advance	
Sharon van Rouwendaal	10 km open water	—N/a				1:59:31.7	2nd place, silver medalist(s)
Tes Schouten	100 m breaststroke	1:07.89	25	Did not advance			
Kira Toussaint	100 m backstroke	59.21	7 Q	59.09	7 Q	59.11	7
Maaike de Waard	100 m backstroke	1:00.03	15 Q	1:00.49	16	Did not advance	
Kim Busch; Femke Heemskerk; Ranomi Kromowidjojo; Marrit Steenbergen^{[b]} Kira Toussaint	4 × 100 m freestyle relay	3:33.51	2 Q	—N/a		3:33.70	4
Femke Heemskerk; Tes Schouten; Kira Toussaint; Maaike de Waard	4 × 100 m medley relay	3:59.89	10	—N/a		Did not advance	

Mixed

Athlete	Event	Heat		Final	
Athlete	Event	Time	Rank	Time	Rank
Arno Kamminga; Nyls Korstanje; Femke Heemskerk; Ranomi Kromowidjojo^{[b]} Kira Toussaint	4 × 100 m medley relay	3:43.25	6 Q	3:41.25 NR	6

^{a} Withdrew from the swim-off. ^{b} Swimmers who participated in the heats only.

== Table tennis ==
The Netherlands entered one athlete into the table tennis competition at the Games. Rio 2016 Olympian Britt Eerland scored an initial-match final triumph to book one of the five available places in the women's singles at the 2021 ITTF World Qualification Tournament in Doha, Qatar.

Athlete	Event	Preliminary	Round 1	Round 2	Round 3	Round of 16	Quarterfinal	Semifinal	Final / BM	
Athlete	Event	Opposition Result	Opposition Result	Opposition Result	Opposition Result	Opposition Result	Opposition Result	Opposition Result	Opposition Result	Rank
Britt Eerland	Women's singles	Bye			Meshref (EGY); W 4–3	Doo H K (HKG); L 1–4	Did not advance			=9

== Taekwondo ==
The Netherlands entered one athlete into the taekwondo competition at the Games. Rio 2016 Olympian and 2017 world bronze medalist Reshmie Oogink secured a spot in the women's heavyweight category (+67 kg) with a top two finish at the 2021 European Qualification Tournament in Sofia, Bulgaria.

Athlete	Event	Round of 16	Quarterfinal	Semifinal	Repechage	Final / BM	
Athlete	Event	Opposition Result	Opposition Result	Opposition Result	Opposition Result	Opposition Result	Rank
Reshmie Oogink	Women's +67 kg	Withdrew due to positive COVID-19 test					

== Tennis ==
Athlete	Event	Round of 64	Round of 32	Round of 16	Quarterfinal	Semifinal	Final / BM	
Athlete	Event	Opposition Score	Opposition Score	Opposition Score	Opposition Score	Opposition Score	Opposition Score	Rank
Wesley Koolhof; Jean-Julien Rojer	Men's doubles	—N/a	Gillé / Vliegen (BEL); W 6–3, 7–6^{(7–5)}	Daniell / Venus (NZL); L WO	Did not advance			
Kiki Bertens	Women's singles	Vondroušová (CZE); L 4–6, 6–3, 4–6	Did not advance					
Kiki Bertens; Demi Schuurs	Women's doubles	—N/a	Garcia / Mladenovic (FRA); W 7–6^{(7–4)}, 5–7, [11–9]	Kudermetova / Vesnina (ROC); L 2–6, 6–3, [7–10]	Did not advance			
Jean-Julien Rojer; Kiki Bertens	Mixed doubles	Withdrew due to Rojer's positive COVID-19 test						

== Triathlon ==
The Netherlands qualified four triathletes (two per gender) for the following events at the Games by finishing among the top seven nations in the ITU Mixed Relay Olympic Rankings.

Individual

Athlete	Event	Time						Rank
Athlete	Event	Swim (1.5 km)	Trans 1	Bike (40 km)	Trans 2	Run (10 km)	Total	Rank
Maya Kingma	Women's	19:20	0:43	1:03:03	0:34	35:36	1:59:16	11
Rachel Klamer	Women's	19:17	0:44	1:03:05	0:33	34:09	1:57:48	4

Relay

Athlete	Event	Time						Rank
Athlete	Event	Swim (300 m)	Trans 1	Bike (7 km)	Trans 2	Run (2 km)	Total group	Rank
Jorik van Egdom	Mixed relay	4:12	0:38	9:38	0:27	5:33	20:28	—N/a
Marco van der Stel	Mixed relay	4:00	0:36	9:34	0:28	5:45	20:23	—N/a
Maya Kingma	Mixed relay	3:43	0:41	10:11	0:29	6:14	21:18	—N/a
Rachel Klamer	Mixed relay	4:32	0:41	10:21	0:33	6:18	22:25	—N/a
Total	Mixed relay	—N/a					1:24:34	4

== Volleyball ==
=== Beach ===
The Netherlands men's and women's beach volleyball teams qualified directly for the Olympics by virtue of their nation's top 15 placement in the FIVB Olympic Rankings of 13 June 2021.

Athlete	Event	Preliminary round				Repechage	Round of 16	Quarterfinal	Semifinal	Final / BM	
Athlete	Event	Opposition Score	Opposition Score	Opposition Score	Rank	Opposition Score	Opposition Score	Opposition Score	Opposition Score	Opposition Score	Rank
Alexander Brouwer; Robert Meeuwsen	Men's	Lucena / Dalhausser (USA); W (21–17, 21–18)	Azaad / Capogrosso (ARG); W (21–14, 21–14)	Alison / Álvaro (BRA); L (14–21, 22–24)	2 Q	Bye	Mol / Sørum (NOR); L (17–21, 19–21)	Did not advance			
Sanne Keizer; Madelein Meppelink	Women's	Elsa / Liliana (ESP); L (21–19, 18–21, 14–16)	Wang Xx / Xue C (CHN); L (21–19, 29–31, 13–15)	Klineman / Ross (USA); L (22–20, 17–21, 5–15)	4	Did not advance					
Raïsa Schoon; Katja Stam	Women's	Pavan / Humana-Paredes (CAN); L (16–21, 14–21)	Heidrich / Vergé-Dépré (SUI); L (20–22, 18–21)	Borger / Sude (GER); W (24–22, 21–16)	3 q	Leila / Lidy (CUB); L (17–21, 17–21)	Did not advance				

== Water polo ==
Summary

Key:
- FT – After full time.
- P – Match decided by penalty-shootout.

Team	Event	Group stage					Quarterfinal	Semifinal	Final / BM	
Team	Event	Opposition Score	Opposition Score	Opposition Score	Opposition Score	Rank	Opposition Score	Opposition Score	Opposition Score	Rank
Netherlands women's	Women's tournament	Australia; L 12–15	Spain; W 14–13	South Africa; W 33–1	Canada; W 16–12	3 Q	Hungary; L 11–14	Classification semifinal China; W 13–6	Fifth place final Australia; L 7–14	6

=== Women's tournament ===
Netherlands women's national water polo team qualified for the Olympics by advancing to the final match and securing an outright berth at the 2020 World Olympic Qualification Tournament in Trieste, Italy. This will mark the country's return to the sport after a thirteen-year absence.

Team roster

The Netherlands's final squad was announced on 24 June 2021.

Head coach: Arno Havenga

No.	Player	Pos.	L/R	Height	Weight	Date of birth (age)	Apps	OG/ Goals	Club	Ref
1	Joanne Koenders	GK	R	1.78 m (5 ft 10 in)	70 kg (154 lb)	28 February 1997 (aged 24)	65	0/0	(Netherlands) Polar Bears Ede	
2	Maud Megens	FP	R	1.83 m (6 ft 0 in)	70 kg (154 lb)	6 February 1996 (aged 25)	170	0/0	(United States) USC Trojans	
3	Dagmar Genee	FP	R	1.78 m (5 ft 10 in)	70 kg (154 lb)	31 January 1989 (aged 32)	220	0/0	(Netherlands) UZSC Utrecht	
4	Sabrina van der Sloot	FP	R	1.75 m (5 ft 9 in)	62 kg (137 lb)	16 March 1991 (aged 30)	275	0/0	(Spain) Sabadell	
5	Iris Wolves	FP	R	1.80 m (5 ft 11 in)	79 kg (174 lb)	9 May 1994 (aged 27)	80	0/0	(Spain) Mediterrani	
6	Nomi Stomphorst (C)	FP	R	1.72 m (5 ft 8 in)	63 kg (139 lb)	23 August 1992 (aged 28)	275	0/0	(Netherlands) GZC Donk	
7	Kitty Joustra	FP	R	1.77 m (5 ft 10 in)	72 kg (159 lb)	11 January 1998 (aged 23)	93	0/0	(United States) California Golden Bears	
8	Vivian Sevenich	FP	L	1.80 m (5 ft 11 in)	82 kg (181 lb)	28 February 1993 (aged 28)	225	0/0	(Spain) Mataró	
9	Maartje Keuning	FP	R	1.83 m (6 ft 0 in)	73 kg (161 lb)	26 April 1998 (aged 23)	70	0/0	(Spain) Sabadell	
10	Ilse Koolhaas	FP	R	1.83 m (6 ft 0 in)	76 kg (168 lb)	11 June 1997 (aged 24)	95	0/0	(Greece) Glyfada	
11	Simone van de Kraats	FP	L	1.80 m (5 ft 11 in)	72 kg (159 lb)	15 November 2000 (aged 20)	70	0/0	(Spain) Mataró	
12	Brigitte Sleeking	FP	R	1.78 m (5 ft 10 in)	68 kg (150 lb)	19 March 1998 (aged 23)	70	0/0	(Greece) Olympiacos	
13	Debby Willemsz	GK	R	1.78 m (5 ft 10 in)	75 kg (165 lb)	10 May 1994 (aged 27)	170	0/0	(Spain) Mediterrani	
Average				1.79 m (5 ft 10 in)	72 kg (159 lb)	26 years, 37 days	144			

Note: Age as of 23 July 2021
Source: Netherlands Women | Tokyo 2020 Olympics Archived 2021-07-22 at the Wayback Machine

Group play

Pos	Team	Pld	W	D	L	GF	GA	GD	Pts	Qualification
1	Spain	4	3	0	1	71	37	+34	6 (Note: Spain 2 Pts, +5 GD; Netherlands 2 Pts, −2 GD; Australia 2 Pts, −3 GD. Spain first and after that the head-to head results between Australia and Netherlands (15–12) came into effect.)	Quarterfinals
2	Australia	4	3	0	1	46	33	+13	6	Quarterfinals
3	Netherlands	4	3	0	1	75	41	+34	6	Quarterfinals
4	Canada	4	1	0	3	48	39	+9	2	Quarterfinals
5	South Africa	4	0	0	4	7	97	−90	0	

Source: Tokyo 2020 and FINA
Rules for classification: 1) Points; 2) Head-to-head points; 3) Head-to-head goal difference; 4) Head-to-head goals scored; 5) Goal difference.
Notes:

26 July 2021; 18:20 v	Report	Australia	15–12	Netherlands	Tokyo Tatsumi International Swimming Center; Referees: Adrian Alexandrescu (ROU), Arkadii Voevodin (RUS)
26 July 2021; 18:20 v	Report	Score by quarters: 3–3, 2–5, 5–2, 5–2			Tokyo Tatsumi International Swimming Center; Referees: Adrian Alexandrescu (ROU), Arkadii Voevodin (RUS)
26 July 2021; 18:20 v	Report	three players 3	Goals	four players 2	Tokyo Tatsumi International Swimming Center; Referees: Adrian Alexandrescu (ROU), Arkadii Voevodin (RUS)

28 July 2021; 19:50 v	Report	Netherlands	14–13	Spain	Tokyo Tatsumi International Swimming Center; Referees: Sébastien Dervieux (FRA), Michael Goldenberg (USA)
28 July 2021; 19:50 v	Report	Score by quarters: 2–3, 3–2, 3–2, 6–6			Tokyo Tatsumi International Swimming Center; Referees: Sébastien Dervieux (FRA), Michael Goldenberg (USA)
28 July 2021; 19:50 v	Report	Van de Kraats 6	Goals	A. Espar 4	Tokyo Tatsumi International Swimming Center; Referees: Sébastien Dervieux (FRA), Michael Goldenberg (USA)

30 July 2021; 14:00 v	Report	South Africa	1–33	Netherlands	Tokyo Tatsumi International Swimming Center; Referees: Nicola Johnson (AUS), Ursula Wengenroth (SUI)
30 July 2021; 14:00 v	Report	Score by quarters: 0–7, 0–9, 1–9, 0–8			Tokyo Tatsumi International Swimming Center; Referees: Nicola Johnson (AUS), Ursula Wengenroth (SUI)
30 July 2021; 14:00 v	Report	Wedderburn 1	Goals	Keuning 6	Tokyo Tatsumi International Swimming Center; Referees: Nicola Johnson (AUS), Ursula Wengenroth (SUI)

1 August 2021; 15:30 v	Report	Netherlands	16–12	Canada	Tokyo Tatsumi International Swimming Center; Referees: Alessandro Severo (ITA), Nenad Periš (CRO)
1 August 2021; 15:30 v	Report	Score by quarters: 4–4, 4–3, 3–2, 5–3			Tokyo Tatsumi International Swimming Center; Referees: Alessandro Severo (ITA), Nenad Periš (CRO)
1 August 2021; 15:30 v	Report	Van de Kraats 6	Goals	Christmas 4	Tokyo Tatsumi International Swimming Center; Referees: Alessandro Severo (ITA), Nenad Periš (CRO)

Quarterfinal

3 August 2021; 18:20 v	Report	Netherlands	11–14	Hungary	Tokyo Tatsumi International Swimming Center; Referees: Nenad Periš (CRO), Alessandro Severo (ITA)
3 August 2021; 18:20 v	Report	Score by quarters: 3–4, 4–4, 2–2, 2–4			Tokyo Tatsumi International Swimming Center; Referees: Nenad Periš (CRO), Alessandro Severo (ITA)
3 August 2021; 18:20 v	Report	Van der Kraats 4	Goals	Leimeter 4	Tokyo Tatsumi International Swimming Center; Referees: Nenad Periš (CRO), Alessandro Severo (ITA)

Classification semifinal

5 August 2021; 14:00 v	Report	China	6–13	Netherlands	Tokyo Tatsumi International Swimming Center; Referees: Viktor Salnichenko (KAZ), György Kun (HUN)
5 August 2021; 14:00 v	Report	Score by quarters: 0–1, 2–5, 1–2, 3–5			Tokyo Tatsumi International Swimming Center; Referees: Viktor Salnichenko (KAZ), György Kun (HUN)
5 August 2021; 14:00 v	Report	Deng 2	Goals	Keuning 5	Tokyo Tatsumi International Swimming Center; Referees: Viktor Salnichenko (KAZ), György Kun (HUN)

Fifth place game

7 August 2021; 11:00 v	Report	Netherlands	7–14	Australia	Tokyo Tatsumi International Swimming Center; Referees: Xevi Buch (ESP), Dion Willis (RSA)
7 August 2021; 11:00 v	Report	Score by quarters: 1–5, 1–3, 2–3, 3–3			Tokyo Tatsumi International Swimming Center; Referees: Xevi Buch (ESP), Dion Willis (RSA)
7 August 2021; 11:00 v	Report	Van de Kraats 3	Goals	Gofers 3	Tokyo Tatsumi International Swimming Center; Referees: Xevi Buch (ESP), Dion Willis (RSA)

== Weightlifting ==
The Netherlands entered one weightlifter after the tripartite commission invitation quotas for +109 kg events had not been allocated.

Athlete	Event	Snatch	Clean & Jerk	Total	Rank
Enzo Kuworge	Men's +109 kg	175	234	409	6

== See also ==
- Netherlands at the 2020 Summer Paralympics
