= Field hockey at the 2020 Summer Olympics =

Field hockey at the Games of the XXXII Olympiad
- Venue: Oi Hockey Stadium
- Dates: 24 July – 6 August 2021
- No. of events: 2

Field hockey was a sport at the 2020 Summer Olympics in Tokyo which took place from 24 July to 6 August 2021 at the Oi Seaside Park. Twenty-four teams (twelve each for men and women) competed in the tournament.

It was originally scheduled to be held in 2020, but on 24 March 2020, the Olympics were postponed to 2021 due to the COVID-19 pandemic.

== Schedule ==
Legend
G	Group stage	¼	Quarter-finals	½	Semi-finals	B	Bronze medal match	F	Gold medal match

Date Event	Sat 24	Sun 25	Mon 26	Tue 27	Wed 28	Thu 29	Fri 30	Sat 31	Sun 1	Mon 2	Tue 3	Wed 4	Thu 5		Fri 6	
Men	G	G	G	G	G	G	G		¼		½		B	F		
Women	G	G	G		G	G	G	G		¼		½			B	F

== Qualification ==
Each of the Continental Champions from five confederations received an automatic berth. Japan as the host nation qualified automatically. In addition, the remaining six nations were to be determined by an olympic qualification event. As Japan emerged as Asian champion in both men's and women's events, a seventh berth was made available in each qualification event. Although the qualification was unaffected by the COVID-19 pandemic.

=== Men ===
Event	Dates	Location(s)	Quota	Qualifier(s)
Host nation	—N/a	—N/a	1	Japan
2018 Asian Games	19 August – 1 September 2018	(Indonesia) Jakarta	–	–^{A}
2019 Pan American Games	30 July – 10 August 2019	(Peru) Lima	1	Argentina
2019 African Olympic Qualifier	12 – 18 August 2019	(South Africa) Stellenbosch	1	South Africa
2019 EuroHockey Championship	16 – 24 August 2019	(Belgium) Antwerp	1	Belgium
2019 Oceania Cup	5 – 8 September 2019	(Australia) Rockhampton	1	Australia
2019 FIH Olympic Qualifiers	25 October – 3 November 2019	Various	7	Canada; Germany; Great Britain; India; Netherlands; New Zealand; Spain
Total			12	

^A – Japan qualified both as the hosts and the continental champions, therefore that quota is added to the FIH Olympic Qualifiers rather than going to the runners-up of the tournament.

=== Women ===
Event	Dates	Location(s)	Quota	Qualifier(s)
Host nation	—N/a	—N/a	1	Japan
2018 Asian Games	19 August – 1 September 2018	(Indonesia) Jakarta	–	–^{1}
2019 Pan American Games	29 July – 9 August 2019	(Peru) Lima	1	Argentina
2019 African Olympic Qualifier	12 – 18 August 2019	(South Africa) Stellenbosch	1	South Africa
2019 EuroHockey Championship	17 – 25 August 2019	(Belgium) Antwerp	1	Netherlands
2019 Oceania Cup	5 – 8 September 2019	(Australia) Rockhampton	1	New Zealand
2019 FIH Olympic Qualifiers	25 October – 3 November 2019	Various	7	Australia; China; Germany; Great Britain; India; Ireland; Spain
Total			12	

^1 – Japan qualified both as the hosts and the continental champions, therefore that quota is added to the FIH Olympic Qualifiers rather than going to the runners-up of the tournament.

== Medal summary ==
=== Medal table ===
Rank	Nation	Gold	Silver	Bronze	Total
1	Belgium	1	0	0	1
1	Netherlands	1	0	0	1
3	Argentina	0	1	0	1
3	Australia	0	1	0	1
5	Great Britain	0	0	1	1
5	India	0	0	1	1
Totals (6 entries)		2	2	2	6

=== Medalists ===
Event	Gold	Silver	Bronze
Men	Belgium; Gauthier Boccard; Tom Boon; Thomas Briels; Cédric Charlier; Félix Denayer; Nicolas De Kerpel; Arthur De Sloover; Sébastien Dockier; John-John Dohmen; Simon Gougnard; Alexander Hendrickx; Antoine Kina; Loïck Luypaert; Augustin Meurmans; Victor Wegnez; Vincent Vanasch; Florent Van Aubel; Arthur Van Doren	Australia; Daniel Beale; Joshua Beltz; Tim Brand; Andrew Charter; Tom Craig; Matt Dawson; Blake Govers; Jeremy Hayward; Tim Howard; Dylan Martin; Trent Mitton; Eddie Ockenden; Flynn Ogilvie; Lachlan Sharp; Joshua Simmonds; Jacob Whetton; Tom Wickham; Aran Zalewski	India; Surender Kumar; Varun Kumar; Birendra Lakra; Vivek Prasad; Dilpreet Singh; Gurjant Singh; Harmanpreet Singh; Hardik Singh; Mandeep Singh; Manpreet Singh; Rupinder Pal Singh; Shamsher Singh; Simranjeet Singh; Nilakanta Sharma; P. R. Sreejesh; Sumit; Lalit Upadhyay; Amit Rohidas
Women	Netherlands; Felice Albers; Eva de Goede; Xan de Waard; Marloes Keetels; Josine Koning; Sanne Koolen; Laurien Leurink; Frédérique Matla; Laura Nunnink; Malou Pheninckx; Pien Sanders; Lauren Stam; Margot van Geffen; Caia van Maasakker; Maria Verschoor; Lidewij Welten	Argentina; Agustina Albertario; Agostina Alonso; Noel Barrionuevo; Valentina Costa Biondi; Emilia Forcherio; Agustina Gorzelany; María José Granatto; Victoria Granatto; Julieta Jankunas; Sofía Maccari; Delfina Merino; Valentina Raposo; Rocío Sánchez Moccia; Micaela Retegui; Victoria Sauze; Belén Succi; Sofía Toccalino; Eugenia Trinchinetti	Great Britain; Giselle Ansley; Grace Balsdon; Fiona Crackles; Maddie Hinch; Sarah Jones; Hannah Martin; Shona McCallin; Lily Owsley; Hollie Pearne-Webb; Isabelle Petter; Ellie Rayer; Sarah Robertson; Anna Toman; Susannah Townsend; Laura Unsworth; Leah Wilkinson

== Men's tournament ==
The competition consisted of two stages; a group stage followed by a knockout stage.

=== Group stage ===
Teams were divided into two groups of six nations, playing every team in their group once. Three points were awarded for a victory, one for a draw. The top four teams per group will qualify to the quarter-finals.

==== Group A ====
Pos	Team	Pld	W	D	L	GF	GA	GD	Pts	Qualification
1	Australia	5	4	1	0	22	9	+13	13	Quarter-finals
2	India	5	4	0	1	15	13	+2	12	Quarter-finals
3	Argentina	5	2	1	2	10	11	−1	7	Quarter-finals
4	Spain	5	1	2	2	9	10	−1	5	Quarter-finals
5	New Zealand	5	1	1	3	11	16	−5	4	
6	Japan (H)	5	0	1	4	10	18	−8	1	

Source: Tokyo 2020 and FIH
Rules for classification: 1) points; 2) matches won; 3) goal difference; 4) goals for; 5) head-to-head result; 6) field goals scored.
(H) Hosts

==== Group B ====
Pos	Team	Pld	W	D	L	GF	GA	GD	Pts	Qualification
1	Belgium	5	4	1	0	26	9	+17	13	Quarter-finals
2	Germany	5	3	0	2	19	10	+9	9	Quarter-finals
3	Great Britain	5	2	2	1	11	11	0	8	Quarter-finals
4	Netherlands	5	2	1	2	13	13	0	7	Quarter-finals
5	South Africa	5	1	1	3	16	24	−8	4	
6	Canada	5	0	1	4	9	27	−18	1	

Source: Tokyo 2020 and FIH
Rules for classification: 1) points; 2) matches won; 3) goal difference; 4) goals for; 5) head-to-head result; 6) field goals scored.

=== Knockout stage ===
Quarter-finals
1 August
Australia (p.s.o.)	2 (3)
Netherlands	2 (0)
1 August
Germany	3
Argentina	1
1 August
India	3
Great Britain	1
1 August
Belgium	3
Spain	1

Semi-finals
3 August
Australia	3
Germany	1
3 August
India	2
Belgium	5

Gold medal match
5 August
Australia	1 (2)
Belgium (p.s.o.)	1 (3)
Bronze medal match
5 August
Germany	4
India	5

=== Final standings ===
As per statistical convention in field hockey, matches decided in regular time are counted as wins and losses, while matches decided by penalty shoot-outs are counted as draws.

Pos	Team	Pld	W	D	L	GF	GA	GD	Pts	Final result
1	Belgium	8	6	2	0	35	13	+22	20	Gold Medal
2	Australia	8	5	3	0	28	13	+15	18	Silver Medal
3	India	8	6	0	2	25	23	+2	18	Bronze Medal
4	Germany	8	4	0	4	27	19	+8	12	Fourth place
5	Great Britain	6	2	2	2	12	14	−2	8	Eliminated in quarter-finals
6	Netherlands	6	2	2	2	15	15	0	8	Eliminated in quarter-finals
7	Argentina	6	2	1	3	11	14	−3	7	Eliminated in quarter-finals
8	Spain	6	1	2	3	10	13	−3	5	Eliminated in quarter-finals
9	New Zealand	5	1	1	3	11	16	−5	4	Eliminated in group stage
10	South Africa	5	1	1	3	16	24	−8	4	Eliminated in group stage
11	Japan (H)	5	0	1	4	10	18	−8	1	Eliminated in group stage
12	Canada	5	0	1	4	9	27	−18	1	Eliminated in group stage

Source: Tokyo2020
(H) Hosts

== Women's tournament ==
The competition consisted of two stages; a group stage followed by a knockout stage.

=== Group stage ===
Teams were divided into two groups of six nations, playing every team in their group once. Three points are awarded for a victory, one for a draw. The top four teams per group will qualify for the quarter-finals.

==== Group A ====
Pos	Team	Pld	W	D	L	GF	GA	GD	Pts	Qualification
1	Netherlands	5	5	0	0	18	2	+16	15	Quarterfinals
2	Germany	5	4	0	1	13	7	+6	12	Quarterfinals
3	Great Britain	5	3	0	2	11	5	+6	9	Quarterfinals
4	India	5	2	0	3	7	14	−7	6	Quarterfinals
5	Ireland	5	1	0	4	4	11	−7	3	
6	South Africa	5	0	0	5	5	19	−14	0	

Source: Tokyo 2020 and FIH
Rules for classification: 1) points; 2) matches won; 3) goal difference; 4) goals for; 5) head-to-head result; 6) field goals scored.

==== Group B ====
Pos	Team	Pld	W	D	L	GF	GA	GD	Pts	Qualification
1	Australia	5	5	0	0	13	1	+12	15	Quarterfinals
2	Spain	5	3	0	2	9	8	+1	9	Quarterfinals
3	Argentina	5	3	0	2	8	8	0	9	Quarterfinals
4	New Zealand	5	2	0	3	8	7	+1	6	Quarterfinals
5	China	5	2	0	3	9	16	−7	6	
6	Japan (H)	5	0	0	5	6	13	−7	0	

Source: Tokyo 2020 and FIH
Rules for classification: 1) points; 2) matches won; 3) goal difference; 4) goals for; 5) head-to-head result; 6) field goals scored.
(H) Hosts

=== Knockout stage ===
Quarter-finals
2 August
Netherlands	3
New Zealand	0
2 August
Spain	2 (0)
Great Britain (p.s.o.)	2 (2)
2 August
Germany	0
Argentina	3
2 August
Australia	0
India	1

Semi-finals
4 August
Netherlands	5
Great Britain	1
4 August
Argentina	2
India	1

Gold medal match
6 August
Netherlands	3
Argentina	1
Bronze medal match
6 August
Great Britain	4
India	3

=== Final standings ===
As per statistical convention in field hockey, matches decided in regular time are counted as wins and losses, while matches decided by penalty shoot-outs are counted as draws.

Pos	Team	Pld	W	D	L	GF	GA	GD	Pts	Final result
1	Netherlands	8	8	0	0	29	4	+25	24	Gold Medal
2	Argentina	8	5	0	3	14	12	+2	15	Silver Medal
3	Great Britain	8	4	1	3	18	15	+3	13	Bronze Medal
4	India	8	3	0	5	12	20	−8	9	Fourth place
5	Australia	6	5	0	1	13	2	+11	15	Eliminated in quarter-finals
6	Germany	6	4	0	2	13	10	+3	12	Eliminated in quarter-finals
7	Spain	6	3	1	2	11	10	+1	10	Eliminated in quarter-finals
8	New Zealand	6	2	0	4	8	10	−2	6	Eliminated in quarter-finals
9	China	5	2	0	3	9	16	−7	6	Eliminated in group stage
10	Ireland	5	1	0	4	4	11	−7	3	Eliminated in group stage
11	Japan (H)	5	0	0	5	6	13	−7	0	Eliminated in group stage
12	South Africa	5	0	0	5	5	19	−14	0	Eliminated in group stage

Source: Tokyo2020
(H) Hosts

== See also ==
- Field hockey at the 2018 Asian Games
- Field hockey at the 2018 Summer Youth Olympics
- Field hockey at the 2019 Pan American Games
