= Erin Hunter (field hockey) =

South African field hockey player

Erin Christie
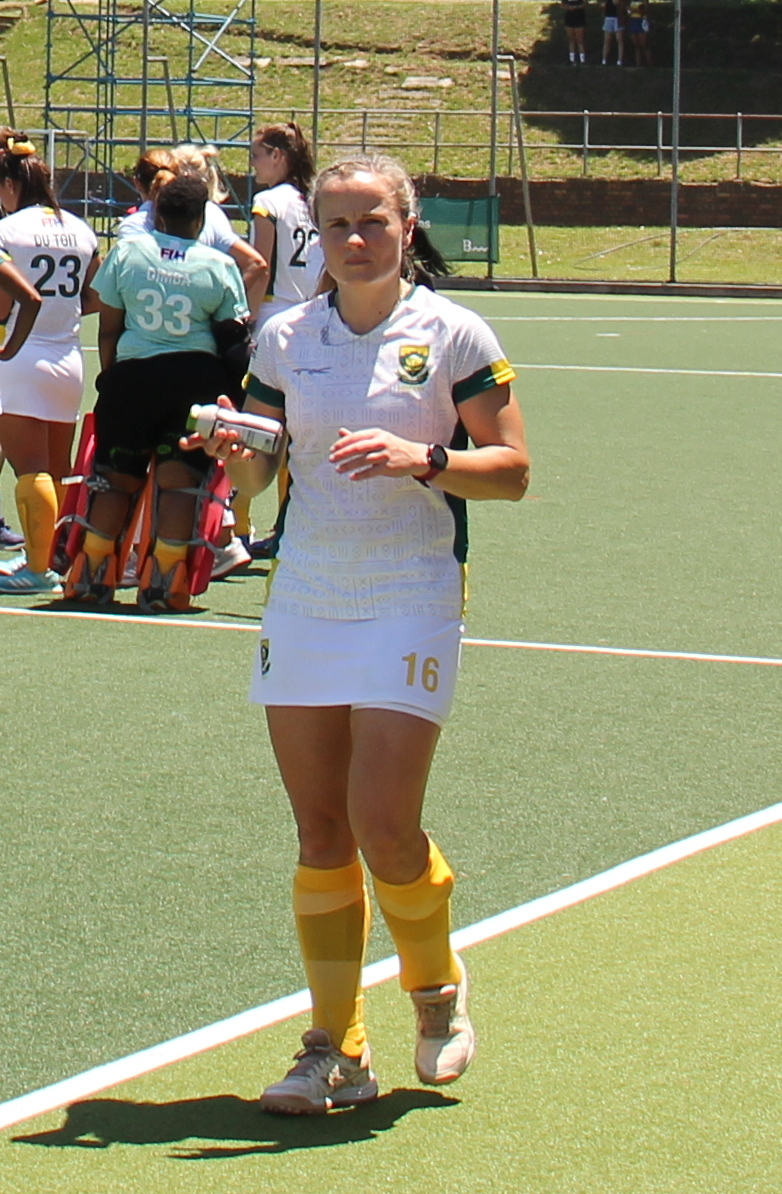
- Test field hockey: South Africa v Germany 26 November 2023

Personal information
- Born: Erin Hunter; 20 March 1992 (age 34)
- Height: 1.65 m (5 ft 5 in)
- Weight: 60 kg (132 lb)

Sport
- Sport: Field hockey
- Position: Defender
- Club: WPCC
Senior career
| Years | Team | Caps | Goals |
| ?-2017 | Spar KZN Raiders | - | - |
| 2017-2022 | Southern Gauteng | 19 | - |
| 2023- | WP | - | - |
| ?-2022 | Crusaders | - | - |
| 2023- | WPCC | - | - |
National team
| Years | Team | Caps | Goals |
| 2013 | South Africa u21 | 6 | (0) |
| 2014–2024 | South Africa | 113 | (9) |
Medal record
Africa Cup of Nations
| Gold medal – first place | 2017 Ismailia |
- Updated on 19 Noverber 2024

Erin Christie (née Hunter; born 20 March 1992) is a South African field hockey player for the South African national team.

== International career ==
She participated at the 2018 Women's Hockey World Cup.

She was captain for the 2020 Summer Olympics.

She retired from her international career post the Olympic Games.

== Personal life ==
In 2015, she graduated from Stellenbosch University with a Postgraduate Certificate in Education and now teaches Physical Science at Rand Park High School in Johannesburg.

In 2019 she married Andrew Hilton Christie.
