= Field hockey at the 2020 Summer Olympics – Women's tournament =

Women's field hockey at the 2020 Summer Olympics

Tournament details
- Host country: Japan
- City: Tokyo
- Dates: 24 July – 6 August 2021
- Teams: 12 (from 5 confederations)
- Venue: Oi Hockey Stadium

Final positions
- Champions: Netherlands (4th title)
- Runner-up: Argentina
- Third place: Great Britain

Tournament statistics
- Matches played: 38
- Goals scored: 142 (3.74 per match)
- Top scorer: (Netherlands) Frédérique Matla (9 goals)

The women's field hockey tournament at the 2020 Summer Olympics was the eleventh edition of the field hockey event for women at the Summer Olympic Games. It was held from 24 July to 6 August 2021. All games were played at the Oi Hockey Stadium in Tokyo, Japan.

It was originally scheduled to be held from 25 July to 7 August 2020, but on 24 March 2020, the Olympics were postponed to 2021 due to the COVID-19 pandemic. Because of this pandemic, the games were played behind closed doors and without the presence of spectators.

Competing in their fifth final in a row (wins in 2008 and 2012; losses in 2004 and 2016), the Netherlands won their fourth title, after winning the final 3–1 over Argentina. The defending champions Great Britain won the bronze medal after defeating India 4–3 in the bronze medal game.

The medals for the competition were presented by Gerardo Werthein, Argentina; IOC Executive Board Member, and the medalists' bouquets were presented by then FIH President Narinder Batra.

== Competition schedule ==
Legend
G	Group stage	¼	Quarter-finals	½	Semi-finals	B	Bronze medal match	F	Gold medal match

Sat 24	Sun 25	Mon 26	Tue 27	Wed 28	Thu 29	Fri 30	Sat 31	Sun 1	Mon 2	Tue 3	Wed 4	Thu 5	Fri 6	
G	G	G		G	G	G	G		¼		½		B	F

== Competition format ==
The twelve teams in the tournament were divided into two groups of six, with each team initially playing round-robin games within their group. Following the completion of the round-robin stage, the top four teams from each group advanced to the quarter-finals. The two semi-final winners met for the gold medal match, while the semi-final losers played in the bronze medal match.

== Qualification ==
Each of the Continental Champions from five confederations received an automatic berth. Japan as the host nation qualified automatically. The other teams qualified through the 2019 Women's FIH Olympic Qualifiers.

Event	Dates	Location(s)	Quota	Qualifier(s)
Host nation	—N/a	—N/a	1	Japan
2018 Asian Games	19 August – 1 September 2018	(Indonesia) Jakarta	–	–^{1}
2019 Pan American Games	29 July – 9 August 2019	(Peru) Lima	1	Argentina
2019 African Olympic Qualifier	12 – 18 August 2019	(South Africa) Stellenbosch	1	South Africa
2019 EuroHockey Championship	17 – 25 August 2019	(Belgium) Antwerp	1	Netherlands
2019 Oceania Cup	5 – 8 September 2019	(Australia) Rockhampton	1	New Zealand
2019 FIH Olympic Qualifiers	25 October – 3 November 2019	Various	7	Australia; China; Germany; Great Britain; India; Ireland; Spain
Total			12	

^1 – Japan qualified both as the hosts and the continental champions, therefore that quota is added to the FIH Olympic Qualifiers rather than going to the runners-up of the tournament.

== Umpires ==
On 11 September 2019, 14 umpires were appointed by the FIH.

- Carolina de la Fuente (ARG)
- Irene Presenqui (ARG)
- Aleisha Neumann (AUS)
- Laurine Delforge (BEL)
- Liu Xiaoying (CHN)
- Michelle Meister (GER)
- Sarah Wilson (GBR)
- Emi Yamada (JPN)
- Amber Church (NZL)
- Kelly Hudson (NZL)
- Michelle Joubert (RSA)
- Annelize Rostron (RSA)
- Ayanna McClean (TTO)
- Maggie Giddens (USA)

== Group stage ==
The pools were announced on 23 November 2019.

All times are local (UTC+9).

=== Group A ===
Pos	Team	Pld	W	D	L	GF	GA	GD	Pts	Qualification
1	Netherlands	5	5	0	0	18	2	+16	15	Quarterfinals
2	Germany	5	4	0	1	13	7	+6	12	Quarterfinals
3	Great Britain	5	3	0	2	11	5	+6	9	Quarterfinals
4	India	5	2	0	3	7	14	−7	6	Quarterfinals
5	Ireland	5	1	0	4	4	11	−7	3	
6	South Africa	5	0	0	5	5	19	−14	0	

Source: Tokyo 2020 and FIH
Rules for classification: 1) points; 2) matches won; 3) goal difference; 4) goals for; 5) head-to-head result; 6) field goals scored.

24 July 2021
20:45
v

Netherlands	5–1	India
Albers 6', 43'; Van Geffen 33'; Matla 45'; Van Maasakker 52'	Report	Rani 10'

North Pitch
Umpires:
Carolina de la Fuente (ARG)
Amber Church (NZL)

24 July 2021
21:15
v

Ireland	2–0	South Africa
Upton 9'; Torrans 45'	Report

South Pitch
Umpires:
Kelly Hudson (NZL)
Emi Yamada (JPN)

25 July 2021
09:30
v

Great Britain	1–2	Germany
Jones 13'	Report	Huse 24'; Stapenhorst 33'

North Pitch
Umpires:
Liu Xiaoying (CHN)
Irene Presenqui (ARG)

26 July 2021
10:00
v

Netherlands	4–0	Ireland
Albers 8'; Pheninckx 49'; Leurink 50'; Matla 56'	Report

South Pitch
Umpires:
Michelle Meister (GER)
Liu Xiaoying (CHN)

26 July 2021
18:30
v

South Africa	1–4	Great Britain
Walraven 6'	Report	Rayer 29', 50'; Toman 39'; Unsworth 40'

North Pitch
Umpires:
Carolina de la Fuente (ARG)
Maggie Giddens (USA)

26 July 2021
21:15
v

Germany	2–0	India
Lorenz 12'; Schröder 35'	Report

South Pitch
Umpires:
Sarah Wilson (GBR)
Emi Yamada (JPN)

28 July 2021
09:30
v

Netherlands	5–0	South Africa
Matla 16', 35'; Keetels 42'; Albers 52'; Verschoor 55'	Report

North Pitch
Umpires:
Amber Church (NZL)
Ayanna McClean (TTO)

28 July 2021
10:00
v

Great Britain	4–1	India
Martin 2', 19'; Owsley 41'; Balsdon 57'	Report	Sharmila 23'

South Pitch
Umpires:
Laurine Delforge (BEL)
Aleisha Neumann (AUS)

28 July 2021
12:15
v

Germany	4–2	Ireland
Altenburg 10', 40'; Pieper 20'; Hauke 55'	Report	Tice 42'; McLoughlin 51'

South Pitch
Umpires:
Michelle Joubert (RSA)
Sarah Wilson (GBR)

29 July 2021
19:00
v

Great Britain	0–1	Netherlands
	Report	Matla 13'

South Pitch
Umpires:
Michelle Joubert (RSA)
Aleisha Neumann (AUS)

30 July 2021
09:30
v

South Africa	1–4	Germany
Marks 53'	Report	Altenburg 2', 24'; Zimmermann 10'; Schröder 49'

North Pitch
Umpires:
Emi Yamada (JPN)
Maggie Giddens (USA)

30 July 2021
11:45
v

Ireland	0–1	India
	Report	Navneet 57'

North Pitch
Umpires:
Aleisha Neumann (AUS)
Annelize Rostron (RSA)

31 July 2021
12:15
v

India	4–3	South Africa
Vandana 4', 17', 49'; Neha 32'	Report	Glasby 15'; Hunter 30'; Marais 39'

South Pitch
Umpires:
Amber Church (NZL)
Liu Xiaoying (CHN)

31 July 2021
18:30
v

Germany	1–3	Netherlands
Zimmermann 23'	Report	Matla 8', 56'; Welten 14'

North Pitch
Umpires:
Irene Presenqui (ARG)
Kelly Hudson (NZL)

31 July 2021
20:45
v

Ireland	0–2	Great Britain
	Report	Townsend 17'; Martin 32'

North Pitch
Umpires:
Carolina de la Fuente (ARG)
Emi Yamada (JPN)

=== Group B ===
Pos	Team	Pld	W	D	L	GF	GA	GD	Pts	Qualification
1	Australia	5	5	0	0	13	1	+12	15	Quarterfinals
2	Spain	5	3	0	2	9	8	+1	9	Quarterfinals
3	Argentina	5	3	0	2	8	8	0	9	Quarterfinals
4	New Zealand	5	2	0	3	8	7	+1	6	Quarterfinals
5	China	5	2	0	3	9	16	−7	6	
6	Japan (H)	5	0	0	5	6	13	−7	0	

Source: Tokyo 2020 and FIH
Rules for classification: 1) points; 2) matches won; 3) goal difference; 4) goals for; 5) head-to-head result; 6) field goals scored.
(H) Hosts

25 July 2021
10:00
v

Australia	3–1	Spain
Malone 31'; Chalker 32'; Stewart 37'	Report	Pérez 33'

South Pitch
Umpires:
Michelle Joubert (RSA)
Annelize Rostron (RSA)

25 July 2021
11:45
v

Japan	3–4	China
Nomura 21'; Y. Nagai 31'; H. Nagai 45+'	Report	Gu 10', 35'; Zhang Y. 20'; Liang 52'

North Pitch
Umpires:
Ayanna McClean (TTO)
Michelle Meister (GER)

25 July 2021
12:15
v

New Zealand	3–0	Argentina
Smith 35'; Ralph 40'; Pearson 54'	Report

South Pitch
Umpires:
Sarah Wilson (GBR)
Maggie Giddens (USA)

26 July 2021
12:15
v

Australia	6–0	China
Chalker 16', 22'; Peris 31'; Malone 54'; Kershaw 56'; Stewart 58'	Report

South Pitch
Umpires:
Amber Church (NZL)
Laurine Delforge (BEL)

26 July 2021
19:00
v

Argentina	3–0	Spain
Raposo 47'; Albertario 57'; Barrionuevo 59'	Report

South Pitch
Umpires:
Ayanna McClean (TTO)
Aleisha Neumann (AUS)

26 July 2021
20:45
v

Japan	1–2	New Zealand
Oikawa 18'	Report	Merry 26'; Ralph 29'

North Pitch
Umpires:
Irene Presenqui (ARG)
Annelize Rostron (RSA)

28 July 2021
11:45
v

New Zealand	1–2	Spain
Smith 35'	Report	Iglesias 8'; Riera 22'

North Pitch
Umpires:
Carolina de la Fuente (ARG)
Michelle Meister (GER)

28 July 2021
18:30
v

Japan	0–1	Australia
	Report	M. Fitzpatrick 33'

North Pitch
Umpires:
Maggie Giddens (USA)
Liu Xiaoying (CHN)

28 July 2021
19:00
v

Argentina	3–2	China
Gorzelany 18', 24'; Jankunas 54'	Report	Li H. 52'; Liu 56'

South Pitch
Umpires:
Annelize Rostron (RSA)
Emi Yamada (JPN)

29 July 2021
18:30
v

Spain	2–0	China
Pérez 4'; Bonastre 19'	Report

North Pitch
Umpires:
Michelle Meister (GER)
Irene Presenqui (ARG)

29 July 2021
20:45
v

Japan	1–2	Argentina
Mori 19'	Report	Gorzelany 10'; M. Granatto 45'

North Pitch
Umpires:
Kelly Hudson (NZL)
Ayanna McClean (TTO)

29 July 2021
21:15
v

New Zealand	0–1	Australia
	Report	Chalker 34'

South Pitch
Umpires:
Sarah Wilson (GBR)
Laurine Delforge (BEL)

31 July 2021
09:30
v

China	3–2	New Zealand
Liu 24'; Chen Y. 37'; Liang 54'	Report	Gunson 20'; Keddell 45'

North Pitch
Umpires:
Laurine Delforge (BEL)
Ayanna McClean (TTO)

31 July 2021
10:00
v

Japan	1–4	Spain
Mori 6'	Report	Barrios 25'; García Grau 38'; Mejías 55'; Bonastre 57'

South Pitch
Umpires:
Sarah Wilson (GBR)
Maggie Giddens (USA)

31 July 2021
11:45
v

Argentina	0–2	Australia
	Report	S. Fitzpatrick 49'; Chalker 59'

North Pitch
Umpires:
Michelle Meister (GER)
Michelle Joubert (RSA)

== Knockout stage ==
=== Bracket ===
Quarter-finals
2 August
Netherlands	3
New Zealand	0
2 August
Spain	2 (0)
Great Britain (p.s.o.)	2 (2)
2 August
Germany	0
Argentina	3
2 August
Australia	0
India	1

Semi-finals
4 August
Netherlands	5
Great Britain	1
4 August
Argentina	2
India	1

Gold medal match
6 August
Netherlands	3
Argentina	1
Bronze medal match
6 August
Great Britain	4
India	3

=== Quarter-finals ===
2 August 2021
09:30
v

Germany	0–3	Argentina
	Report	Albertario 27'; V. Granatto 29'; Raposo 52'

Umpires:
Laurine Delforge (BEL)
Amber Church (NZL)

2 August 2021
12:00
v

Australia	0–1	India
	Report	Gurjit 22'

Umpires:
Carolina de la Fuente (ARG)
Irene Presenqui (ARG)

2 August 2021
18:30
v

Netherlands	3–0	New Zealand
Welten 7'; Matla 21'; Stam 37'	Report

Umpires:
Michelle Meister (GER)
Michelle Joubert (RSA)

2 August 2021
21:00
v

Spain	2–2	Great Britain
Iglesias 20'; Bonastre 51'	Report	Martin 17'; Balsdon 37'
Penalties
Ycart (penalty shoot-out missed); García Grau (penalty shoot-out missed); Oliva (penalty shoot-out missed); Pérez (penalty shoot-out missed)	0–2	(penalty shoot-out missed) Toman; (penalty shoot-out scored) Martin; (penalty shoot-out scored) Jones

Umpires:
Aleisha Neumann (AUS)
Annelize Rostron (RSA)

=== Semi-finals ===
4 August 2021
10:30
v

Netherlands	5–1	Great Britain
Albers 19', 38'; Keetels 18'; Verschoor 32'; Matla 49'	Report	Ansley 41'

Umpires:
Michelle Joubert (RSA)
Laurine Delforge (BEL)

4 August 2021
19:00
v

Argentina	2–1	India
Barrionuevo 18', 37'	Report	Gurjit 2'

Umpires:
Amber Church (NZL)
Sarah Wilson (GBR)

=== Bronze medal match ===
6 August 2021
10:30
v

(bronze) Great Britain	4–3	India
Rayer 16'; Robertson 24'; Pearne-Webb 35'; Balsdon 48'	Report	Gurjit 25', 26'; Vandana 29'

Umpires:
Michelle Joubert (RSA)
Michelle Meister (GER)

=== Gold medal match ===
6 August 2021
19:00
v

(gold) Netherlands	3–1	Argentina (silver)
Van Geffen 23'; Van Maasakker 26', 29'	Report	Gorzelany 30+'

Umpires:
Laurine Delforge (BEL)
Sarah Wilson (GBR)

Team details

Netherlands
Argentina

GK	22	Josine Koning
DF	13	Caia van Maasakker
DF	18	Pien Sanders
DF	21	Lauren Stam	14'
DF	23	Margot van Geffen
DF	7	Xan de Waard
MF	8	Marloes Keetels
MF	24	Eva de Goede (c)
FW	11	Maria Verschoor
FW	12	Lidewij Welten
FW	15	Frédérique Matla
Substitutions:
DF	3	Sanne Koolen		(substituted on) 2'
MF	5	Malou Pheninckx		(substituted on) 3'
MF	6	Laurien Leurink		(substituted on) 3'
MF	10	Felice Albers		(substituted on) 4'
MF	20	Laura Nunnink		(substituted on) 4'
Manager:
(Australia) Alyson Annan

GK	1	Belén Succi
DF	3	Agustina Gorzelany
DF	4	Valentina Raposo
DF	27	Noel Barrionuevo (c)
MF	2	Sofía Toccalino
MF	5	Agostina Alonso
MF	17	Rocío Sánchez Moccia
MF	18	Victoria Sauze
MF	22	Eugenia Trinchinetti
FW	10	María José Granatto
FW	12	Delfina Merino
Substitutions:
FW	7	Agustina Albertario	57'	(substituted on) 5'
FW	21	Victoria Granatto		(substituted on) 5'
MF	23	Micaela Retegui		(substituted on) 9'
MF	24	Emilia Forcherio		(substituted on) 57'
FW	28	Julieta Jankunas		(substituted on) 5'
Manager:
(Argentina) Carlos Retegui

== Goalscorers ==
There were 142 goals scored in 38 matches, for an average of 3.74 goals per match.

9 goals

- (Netherlands) Frédérique Matla

6 goals

- (Netherlands) Felice Albers

5 goals

- (Australia) Emily Chalker

4 goals

- (Argentina) Agustina Gorzelany
- (Germany) Lisa Altenburg
- (United Kingdom) Hannah Martin
- (India) Gurjit Kaur
- (India) Vandana Katariya

3 goals

- (Argentina) Noel Barrionuevo
- (United Kingdom) Grace Balsdon
- (United Kingdom) Elena Rayer
- (Netherlands) Caia van Maasakker
- (Spain) Berta Bonastre

2 goals

- (Argentina) Agustina Albertario
- (Argentina) Valentina Raposo
- (Australia) Ambrosia Malone
- (Australia) Grace Stewart
- (China) Gu Bingfeng
- (China) Liang Meiyu
- (China) Liu Meng
- (Germany) Anne Schröder
- (Germany) Sonja Zimmermann
- (Japan) Kanon Mori
- (Netherlands) Margot van Geffen
- (Netherlands) Marloes Keetels
- (Netherlands) Maria Verschoor
- (Netherlands) Lidewij Welten
- (New Zealand) Hope Ralph
- (New Zealand) Kelsey Smith
- (Spain) Belén Iglesias
- (Spain) Beatriz Pérez

1 goal

- (Argentina) María José Granatto
- (Argentina) Victoria Granatto
- (Argentina) Julieta Jankunas
- (Australia) Savannah Fitzpatrick
- (Australia) Madison Fitzpatrick
- (Australia) Stephanie Kershaw
- (Australia) Brooke Peris
- (China) Chen Yang
- (China) Li Hong
- (China) Zhang Ying
- (Germany) Franzisca Hauke
- (Germany) Viktoria Huse
- (Germany) Nike Lorenz
- (Germany) Cécile Pieper
- (Germany) Charlotte Stapenhorst
- (United Kingdom) Giselle Ansley
- (United Kingdom) Sarah Jones
- (United Kingdom) Lily Owsley
- (United Kingdom) Hollie Pearne-Webb
- (United Kingdom) Sarah Robertson
- (United Kingdom) Anna Toman
- (United Kingdom) Susannah Townsend
- (United Kingdom) Laura Unsworth
- (India) Sharmila Devi
- (India) Neha Goyal
- (India) Navneet Kaur
- (India) Rani Rampal
- (Republic of Ireland) Hannah McLoughlin
- (Republic of Ireland) Elena Tice
- (Republic of Ireland) Sarah Torrans
- (Republic of Ireland) Róisín Upton
- (Japan) Hazuki Nagai
- (Japan) Yuri Nagai
- (Japan) Kana Nomura
- (Japan) Shihori Oikawa
- (Netherlands) Laurien Leurink
- (Netherlands) Malou Pheninckx
- (Netherlands) Lauren Stam
- (New Zealand) Ella Gunson
- (New Zealand) Rose Keddell
- (New Zealand) Olivia Merry
- (New Zealand) Holly Pearson
- (South Africa) Tarryn Glasby
- (South Africa) Erin Hunter
- (South Africa) Marizen Marais
- (South Africa) Toni Marks
- (South Africa) Nicole Walraven
- (Spain) Laura Barrios
- (Spain) Begoña García Grau
- (Spain) Candela Mejías
- (Spain) Lola Riera

Source: Tokyo2020 and FIH

== Final ranking ==
As per statistical convention in field hockey, matches decided in regular time are counted as wins and losses, while matches decided by penalty shoot-outs are counted as draws.

Pos	Team	Pld	W	D	L	GF	GA	GD	Pts	Final result
1	Netherlands	8	8	0	0	29	4	+25	24	Gold Medal
2	Argentina	8	5	0	3	14	12	+2	15	Silver Medal
3	Great Britain	8	4	1	3	18	15	+3	13	Bronze Medal
4	India	8	3	0	5	12	20	−8	9	Fourth place
5	Australia	6	5	0	1	13	2	+11	15	Eliminated in quarter-finals
6	Germany	6	4	0	2	13	10	+3	12	Eliminated in quarter-finals
7	Spain	6	3	1	2	11	10	+1	10	Eliminated in quarter-finals
8	New Zealand	6	2	0	4	8	10	−2	6	Eliminated in quarter-finals
9	China	5	2	0	3	9	16	−7	6	Eliminated in group stage
10	Ireland	5	1	0	4	4	11	−7	3	Eliminated in group stage
11	Japan (H)	5	0	0	5	6	13	−7	0	Eliminated in group stage
12	South Africa	5	0	0	5	5	19	−14	0	Eliminated in group stage

Source: Tokyo2020
(H) Hosts

== Cockroach recording ==
On 26 July 2021, during the last five minutes of the preliminary match between Argentina and Spain, a cockroach was recorded on the field. While switching between cameras, the Argentinian sports channel Torneos y Competencias spent several seconds with one cameraperson that was focused on a cockroach walking atop a fence, leading the TyC Sports commentator to acknowledge the presence of "la cucaracha". A clip of the cockroach uploaded to Twitter by user @s6antispam went viral, receiving 8.2 million views worldwide over the weekend.
