= Lauren Stam =

Dutch field hockey player

Personal information
- Full name: Lauren Lara Jeanette Stam
- Born: 30 January 1994 (age 32)
- Height: 1.70 m (5 ft 7 in)

Sport
- Sport: Field hockey
- Position: Defender
National team
Years	Team	Caps	Goals
–	Netherlands	53	(3)
Medal record
Olympic Games
Gold medal – first place	2020 Tokyo	Team
World Cup
Gold medal – first place	2018 London
European Championship
Gold medal – first place	2019 Antwerp
Gold medal – first place	2021 Amstelveen
Champions Trophy
Gold medal – first place	2018 Changzhou

Lauren Stam (born 30 January 1994) is a Dutch field hockey player for the Dutch national team.

She won gold with the Dutch team at the 2018 Women's Hockey World Cup, and the 2020 Summer Olympics.
