= Maria Verschoor =

Dutch field hockey player (born 1994)

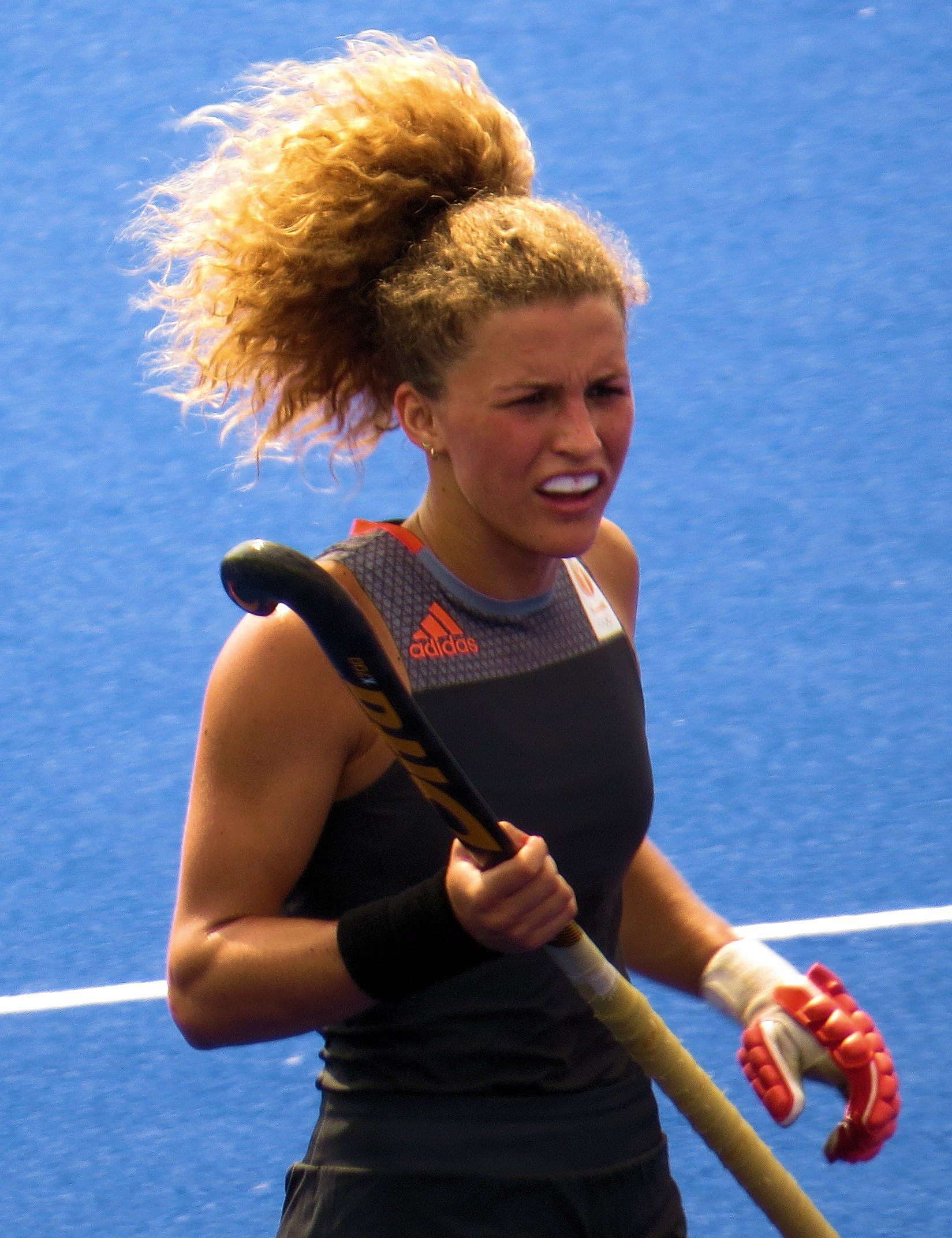
- Verschoor in 2016

Personal information
- Nationality: Dutch
- Born: 22 April 1994 (age 32) Dordrecht, Netherlands
- Height: 1.64 m (5 ft 5 in)
- Weight: 58 kg (128 lb)

Sport
- Country: Netherlands
- Sport: Field hockey
Medal record
Olympic Games
| Gold medal – first place | 2020 Tokyo | Team |
| Gold medal – first place | 2024 Paris | Team |
| Silver medal – second place | 2016 Rio de Janeiro | Team |
World Cup
| Gold medal – first place | 2022 Terrassa/Amstelveen |
European Championship
| Gold medal – first place | 2017 Amstelveen |
| Gold medal – first place | 2019 Antwerp |
| Gold medal – first place | 2021 Amstelveen |
| Gold medal – first place | 2023 Mönchengladbach |
Champions Trophy
| Gold medal – first place | 2018 Changzhou |

Maria Verschoor (born 22 April 1994) is a Dutch field hockey player. She began playing for HC Hoekschewaard before joining HC Rotterdam. She moved up from junior to senior teams and in 2012 she moved to the Amsterdam Hockey & Bandy Club.

Verschoor joined the Netherlands national team when she was nineteen. She took part in the 2016 Summer Olympics, when the team took silver. She was also a member of the team which won gold in the 2020 Summer Olympics and the 2024 Summer Olympics.
