= Ayanna McClean =

Trinidadian field hockey player and umpire

- Born: Belmont, Port of Spain
- Education: Hofstra University
- Known for: Field hockey umpire

Ayanna McClean is a hockey umpire from Trinidad and Tobago and former defender for the Trinidad and Tobago women's national field hockey team. She is the second person from the Caribbean to be qualified to umpire at a World Cup or Olympic tournament, after Roger St Rose, and the first woman. She is the daughter of Cherril Franco, who was the first woman from Trinidad and Tobago to become an FIH Grade One umpire.

== Playing career ==
McClean started playing hockey when she was 11. McClean was previously a member of the Ventures Hockey Club and she captained both her school team at South-East Port-of-Spain and the under-21 Ventures team. She received a hockey scholarship to attend Hofstra University in Long Island, New York in 2004, and later captained hockey team at Hofstra as well. She was a member of the under-21 Trinidad and Tobago training squad. She later represented Trinidad and Tobago at the 2003 Pan American Games in Santo Domingo.

== Umpiring career ==
While still playing at Hofstra, McClean became an FIH certified umpire. Her first international appointment was at the 2005 Junior Pan American Games in Puerto Rico. She went on to umpire at the 2007 Pan American Games, the 2009 Pan American Cup and the 2010 Pan American Youth Championships. In 2010 she was appointed as a neutral umpire for the inaugural Youth Olympic Games in Singapore. At the 2013 Pan American Cup McClean was honored for umpiring her 50th international match. Upon receiving her FIH Grade One in 2013, she became the highest-ranked female umpire from the Caribbean, and has been so since. In the run-up to the Olympic Games of 2016 she was heavily involved in umpiring Olympic Qualification tournaments, including the 2015 Hockey World League Semi-Final in Valencia, Spain, the 2015 Hockey World League Final in Rosario, Argentina, and the 2015 Pan American Games in Toronto, Canada. In 2017 it was announced that McClean was appointed to umpire at the 2018 Hockey World Cup in London, UK. On the Olympic Games of 2024 in Paris, she was the referee for the match of Belgium against Japan.
