= Laura Nunnink =

Dutch field hockey player (born 1995)

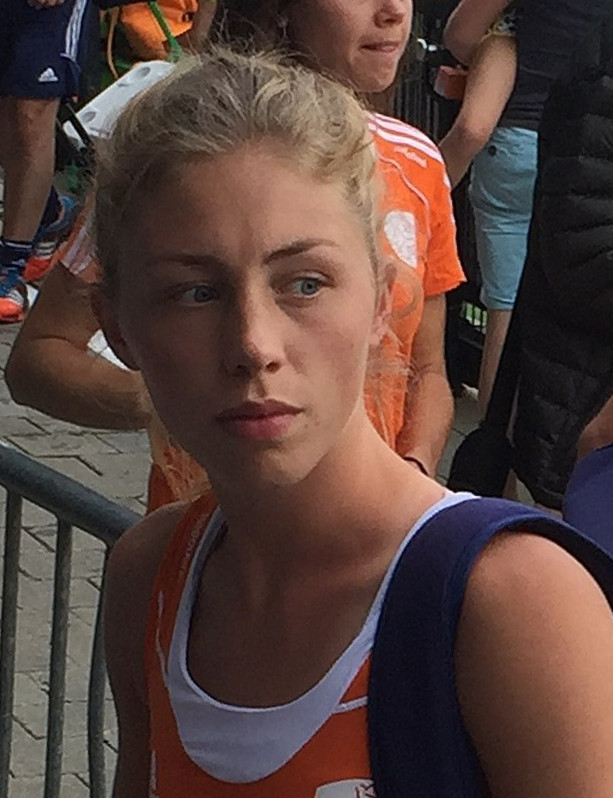
- Nunnink in 2016

Personal information
- Full name: Laura Maria Nunnink
- Born: 26 January 1995 (age 31) Eindhoven, Netherlands
- Height: 1.72 m (5 ft 8 in)
- Weight: 64 kg (141 lb)

Sport
- Sport: Field hockey
- Position: Midfielder
- Club: Den Bosch
Senior career
| Years | Team | Caps | Goals |
| –2020 | Oranje-Rood | - | - |
| 2020–present | Den Bosch | - | - |
National team
| Years | Team | Caps | Goals |
| 2013–present | Netherlands | 120 | (2) |
Medal record
Women's field hockey
Representing the Netherlands
Olympic Games
| Gold medal – first place | 2020 Tokyo | Team |
| Gold medal – first place | 2024 Paris | Team |
World Cup
| Gold medal – first place | 2018 London |
| Gold medal – first place | 2022 Terrassa/Amstelveen |
European Championship
| Gold medal – first place | 2017 Amstelveen |
| Gold medal – first place | 2019 Antwerp |
| Gold medal – first place | 2021 Amstelveen |
| Gold medal – first place | 2023 Mönchengladbach |
| Silver medal – second place | 2015 London |
Champions Trophy
| Gold medal – first place | 2018 Changzhou |
| Bronze medal – third place | 2014 Mendoza |
Junior World Cup
| Gold medal – first place | 2013 Mönchengladbach |
EuroHockey Junior Championship
| Gold medal – first place | Waterloo 2014 |

Laura Maria Nunnink (born 26 January 1995) is a Dutch field hockey player for the Dutch national team.

She was part of the 2020 Tokyo and 2024 Paris women's field hockey Olympic champion team.

She also played in the gold-winning Dutch team at the 2018 Women's Hockey World Cup.
