= Sanne Koolen =

Dutch field hockey player

Personal information
- Born: 23 March 1996 (age 30)

Sport
- Sport: Field hockey
- Position: Defender
National team
Years	Team	Caps	Goals
–	Netherlands	15	(0)
Medal record
Olympic Games
Gold medal – first place	2020 Tokyo	Team
Gold medal – first place	2024 Paris	Team
World Cup
Gold medal – first place	2018 London
Gold medal – first place	2022 Terrassa/Amstelveen
Silver medal – second place	2026 Wavre/Amstelveen
European Championship
Gold medal – first place	2019 Antwerp
Gold medal – first place	2021 Amstelveen
Gold medal – first place	2023 Mönchengladbach
Gold medal – first place	2025 Mönchengladbach

Sanne Koolen (born 23 March 1996) is a Dutch field hockey player for the Dutch national team.

She participated at the 2018 Women's Hockey World Cup, where the Netherlands won gold.

She was also part of the 2020 Tokyo and 2024 Paris women's field hockey Olympic champion team.
