= Margot van Geffen =

Dutch field hockey player

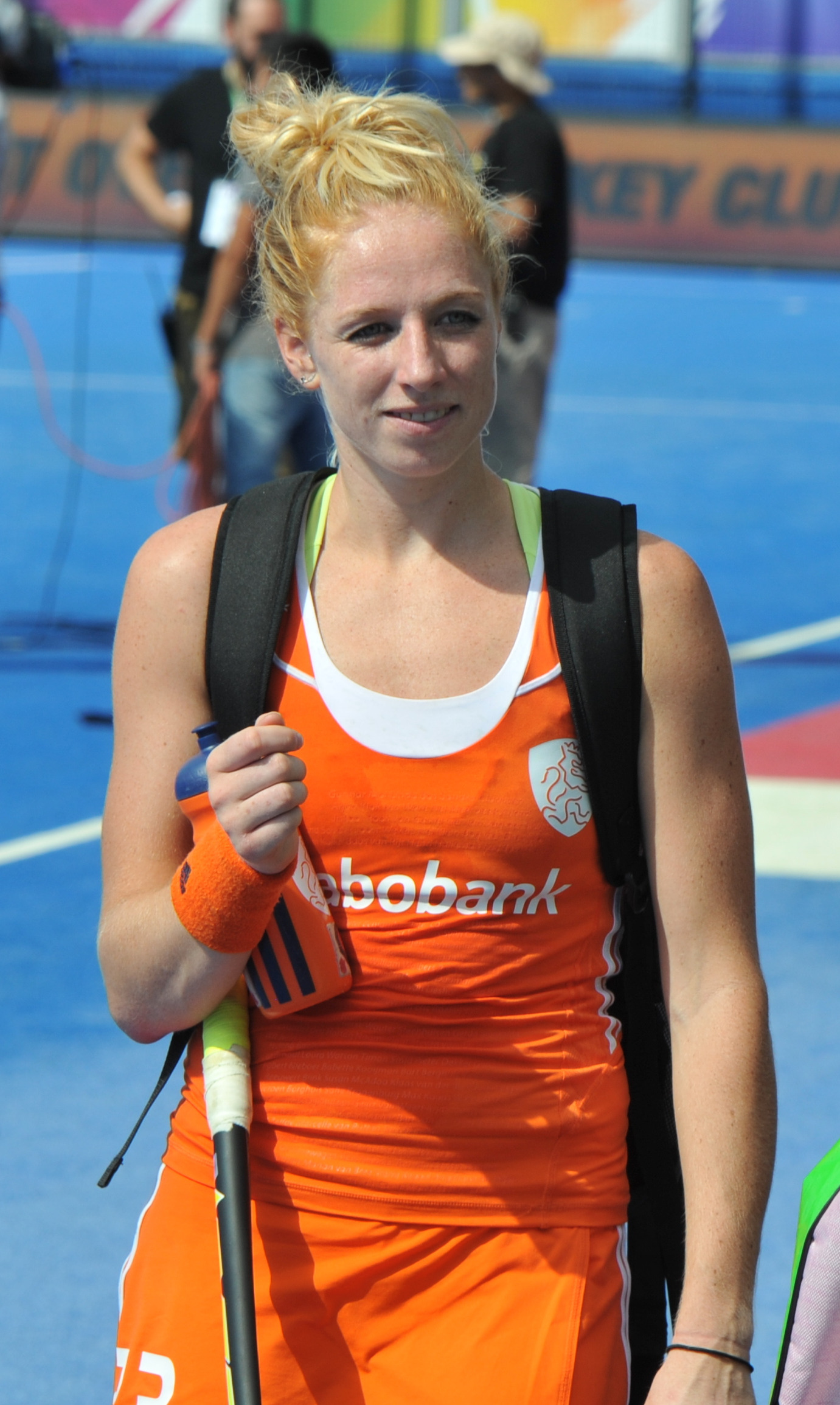
- Van Geffen at the 2015 EuroHockey

Personal information
- Born: 23 November 1989 (age 36) Tilburg, Netherlands
- Height: 1.71 m (5 ft 7 in)
- Weight: 63 kg (139 lb)

Sport
- Sport: Field hockey
- Position: Defender
- Club: HC 's-Hertogenbosch
National team
Years	Team	Caps	Goals
2011–	Netherlands	168	(12)
Medal record
Representing the Netherlands
Olympic Games
Gold medal – first place	2012 London	Team
Gold medal – first place	2020 Tokyo	Team
Silver medal – second place	2016 Rio de Janeiro	Team
World Cup
Gold medal – first place	2014 The Hague
Gold medal – first place	2022 Terrassa/Amstelveen
European Championship
Gold medal – first place	2017 Amstelveen
Gold medal – first place	2019 Antwerp
Gold medal – first place	2021 Amstelveen
Gold medal – first place	2023 Mönchengladbach
Silver medal – second place	2015 London
Bronze medal – third place	2013 Boom
Champions Trophy
Gold medal – first place	2018 Changzhou
Bronze medal – third place	2012 Rosario
Bronze medal – third place	2014 Mendoza

Margot van Geffen (born 23 November 1989) is a Dutch field hockey player.

She took up field hockey aged six and became a member of the Dutch national team in 2011. She won the 2014 World Cup and a gold and a silver medal at the 2012 and 2016 Olympics, respectively. After the 2012 Olympics she was invested as a Knight of the Order of Orange-Nassau. She was also part of the Dutch gold-winning team at the 2020 Tokyo Olympics.

Van Geffen was not chosen for the Dutch team for the 2024 Summer Olympics. This marked the end of her international career, during which she became number three in the Dutch all-time rankings with 265 international hockey matches played.
