= Josine Koning =

Dutch field hockey player

Personal information
- Born: 2 September 1995 (age 31)
- Height: 1.67 m (5 ft 6 in)

Sport
- Sport: Field hockey
- Position: Goalkeeper
- Club: HC 's-Hertogenbosch
National team
Years	Team	Caps	Goals
2017–present	Netherlands	79	(0)
Medal record
Olympic Games
Gold medal – first place	2020 Tokyo	Team
World Cup
Gold medal – first place	2018 London
Gold medal – first place	2022 Terrassa/Amstelveen
Silver medal – second place	2026 Wavre/Amstelveen
European Championship
Gold medal – first place	2019 Antwerp
Gold medal – first place	2021 Amstelveen
Gold medal – first place	2023 Mönchengladbach
Gold medal – first place	2025 Mönchengladbach
Champions Trophy
Gold medal – first place	2018 Changzhou

Josine Koning (born 2 September 1995) is a Dutch field hockey player who plays as a goalkeeper for Den Bosch and the Dutch national team.

She participated at the 2018 Women's Hockey World Cup. Koning was part of the Dutch gold-winning team at both the 2018 Champions Trophy and the 2020 Summer Olympics.
