= Laurien Leurink =

Dutch field hockey player (born 1994)

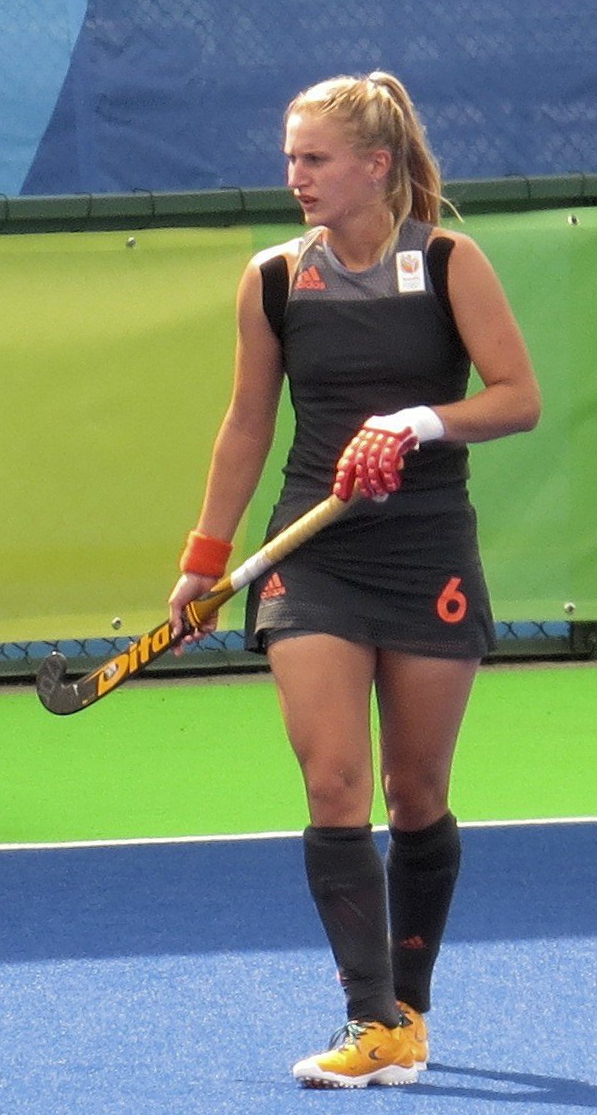
- Leurink at the 2016 Summer Olympics

Personal information
- Born: 13 November 1994 (age 31)
- Height: 1.73 m (5 ft 8 in)
- Weight: 67 kg (148 lb)

Sport
- Sport: Field hockey
- Position: Midfielder
- Club: Laren
National team
Years	Team	Caps	Goals
–	Netherlands	68	(18)
Medal record
Representing the Netherlands
Olympic Games
Gold medal – first place	2020 Tokyo	Team
Silver medal – second place	2016 Rio de Janeiro	Team
World Cup
Gold medal – first place	2018 London
Gold medal – first place	2022 Terrassa/Amstelveen
European Championship
Gold medal – first place	2017 Amstelveen
Gold medal – first place	2019 Antwerp
Gold medal – first place	2021 Amstelveen
Champions Trophy
Gold medal – first place	2018 Changzhou

Laurien Leurink (born 13 November 1994) is a Dutch field hockey midfielder who plays as a midfielder. She won a silver medal at the 2016 Summer Olympics.

She was part of the 2020 Tokyo women's field hockey Olympic champion team.
