= Tennis at the 2020 Summer Olympics – Day-by-day summaries =

The 2020 Summer Olympics order of play for matches on the main courts, starting from 24 July until July 1 August.

All dates and times are JST (UTC+09:00).

== Day 1 (24 July) ==
- Seeds out:
  - Women's singles: Kiki Bertens (NED) [16]
  - Men's doubles: Pierre-Hugues Herbert (FRA) / Nicolas Mahut (FRA) [2], Hubert Hurkacz (POL) / Łukasz Kubot (POL) [5], Karen Khachanov (ROC) / Andrey Rublev (ROC) [6]
  - Women's doubles: Chan Hao-ching (TPE) / Latisha Chan (TPE) [5], Gabriela Dabrowski (CAN) / Sharon Fichman (CAN) [7]
- Order of play

Matches on main courts
Matches in Ariake Coliseum
Event	Winner	Loser	Score
Women's singles first round	Iga Świątek (POL) [6]	Mona Barthel (GER) [PR]	6–2, 6–2
Men's singles first round	Daniil Medvedev (ROC) [2]	Alexander Bublik (KAZ)	6–4, 7–6^{(10–8)}
Women's singles first round	Barbora Krejcikova (CZE) [8]	Zarina Diyas (KAZ)	5–2, retired
Men's singles first round	Novak Djokovic (SRB) [1]	Hugo Dellien (BOL)	6–2, 6–2
Matches on Court 1
Event	Winner	Loser	Score
Women's singles first round	Anna-Lena Friedsam (GER) [ITF]	Heather Watson (GBR)	7–6^{(7–5)}, 6–3
Men's singles first round	Lorenzo Sonego (ITA) [13]	Taro Daniel (JPN)	4–6, 7–6^{(8–6)}, 7–6^{(7–3)}
Women's singles first round	Belinda Bencic (SUI) [9]	Jessica Pegula (USA)	6–3, 6–3
Men's singles first round	Pablo Carreño Busta (ESP) [6]	Tennys Sandgren (USA)	7–5, 6–2

== Day 2 (25 July) ==
- Seeds out:
  - Men's singles: Andrey Rublev (ROC) [5], Félix Auger-Aliassime (CAN) [9], Gaël Monfils (FRA) [10]
  - Women's singles: Ashleigh Barty (AUS) [1], Jennifer Brady (USA) [10], Elise Mertens (BEL) [12]
  - Men's doubles: Aslan Karatsev (ROC) / Daniil Medvedev (ROC) [4]
  - Women's doubles: Shuko Aoyama (JPN) / Ena Shibahara (JPN) [2], Nicole Melichar (USA) / Alison Riske (USA) [8]
- Order of play

Matches on main courts
Matches in Ariake Coliseum
Event	Winner	Loser	Score
Women's singles first round	Sara Sorribes Tormo (ESP)	Ashleigh Barty (AUS) [1]	6–4, 6–3
Women's singles first round	Naomi Osaka (JPN) [2]	Zheng Saisai (CHN)	6–1, 6–4
Men's singles first round	Max Purcell (AUS) [ALT]	Félix Auger-Aliassime (CAN) [9]	6–4, 7–6^{(7–2)}
Men's singles first round	Stefanos Tsitsipas (GRE) [3]	Philipp Kohlschreiber (GER) [PR]	6–3, 3–6, 6–3
Matches on Court 1
Event	Winner	Loser	Score
Women's singles first round	Aryna Sabalenka (BLR) [3]	Magda Linette (POL)	6–2, 6–1
Men's singles first round	Alexander Zverev (GER) [4]	Lu Yen-hsun (TPE) [PR]	6–1, 6–3
Women's singles first round	Elina Svitolina (UKR) [4]	Laura Siegemund (GER)	6–3, 5–7, 6–4
Men's singles first round	Kei Nishikori (JPN)	Andrey Rublev (ROC) [5]	6–3, 6–4

== Day 3 (26 July) ==
- Seeds out:
  - Men's singles: Lorenzo Sonego (ITA) [13]
  - Women's singles: Aryna Sabalenka (BLR) [3], Iga Świątek (POL) [6], Petra Kvitová (CZE) [10]
  - Men's doubles: Jamie Murray (GBR) / Neal Skupski (GBR) [7], Wesley Koolhof (NED) / Jean-Julien Rojer (NED) [8]
  - Women's doubles: Kiki Bertens (NED) / Demi Schuurs (NED) [3]
- Order of play

Matches on main courts
Matches in Ariake Coliseum
Event	Winner	Loser	Score
Women's singles second round	Naomi Osaka (JPN) [2]	Viktorija Golubic (SUI)	6-3, 6-2
Men's singles second round	Alexander Zverev (GER) [4]	Daniel Elahi Galán (COL)	6–2, 6–2
Women's singles second round	Donna Vekić (CRO)	Aryna Sabalenka (BLR) [3]	6–4, 3–6, 7–6^{(7–3)}
Men's singles second round	Novak Djokovic (SRB) [1]	Jan-Lennard Struff (GER)	6–4, 6–3
Matches on Court 1
Event	Winner	Loser	Score
Women's singles second round	Garbiñe Muguruza (ESP) [7]	Wang Qiang (CHN) [ITF]	6-3, 6-0
Women's singles second round	Belinda Bencic (SUI) [9]	Misaki Doi (JPN)	6–2, 6–4
Men's singles second round	Daniil Medvedev (ROC) [2]	Sumit Nagal (IND) [ITF]	6–2, 6–1
Men's singles second round	Pablo Carreño Busta (ESP) [6]	Marin Čilić (CRO)	5–7, 6–4, 6–4

== Day 4 (27 July) ==
- Seeds out:
  - Men's singles: Hubert Hurkacz (POL) [7], Aslan Karatsev (ROC) [11]
  - Women's singles: Naomi Osaka (JPN) [2], Karolína Plíšková (CZE) [5], Barbora Krejčíková (CZE) [8], Maria Sakkari (GRE) [14]
- Order of play

Matches on main courts
Matches in Ariake Coliseum
Event	Winner	Loser	Score
Men's singles second round	Stefanos Tsitsipas (GRE) [3]	Frances Tiafoe (USA)	6–3, 6–4
Women's singles third round	Markéta Vondroušová (CZE)	Naomi Osaka (JPN) [2]	6–1, 6–4
Women's singles third round	Elina Svitolina (UKR) [4]	Maria Sakkari (GRE) [14]	5–7, 6–3, 6–4
Men's singles second round	Kei Nishikori (JPN)	Marcos Giron (USA)	7–6^{(7–5)}, 3–6, 6–1
Matches on Court 1
Event	Winner	Loser	Score
Men's singles second round	Diego Schwartzman (ARG) [8]	Tomáš Macháč (CZE) [ITF]	6–4, 7–5
Men's singles second round	Liam Broady (GBR) [ITF]	Hubert Hurkacz (POL) [7]	7–5, 3–6, 6–3
Women's singles third round	Elena Rybakina (KAZ) [15]	Donna Vekić (CRO)	7–6^{(7–3)}, 6–4

== Day 5 (28 July) ==
- Seeds out:
  - Men's singles: Stefanos Tsitsipas (GRE) [3], Diego Schwartzman (ARG) [8], Fabio Fognini (ITA) [15], Alejandro Davidovich Fokina (ESP) [16]
  - Women's singles: Garbiñe Muguruza (ESP) [7], Anastasia Pavlyuchenkova (ROC) [13]
  - Men's doubles: Juan Sebastián Cabal (COL) / Robert Farah (COL) [3]
  - Women's doubles: Bethanie Mattek-Sands (USA) / Jessica Pegula (USA) [4], Ashleigh Barty (AUS) / Storm Sanders (AUS) [6]
  - Mixed doubles: Kristina Mladenovic (FRA) / Nicolas Mahut (FRA) [1], Bethanie Mattek-Sands (USA) / Rajeev Ram (USA) [3]
- Order of play

Matches on main courts
Matches in Ariake Coliseum
Event	Winner	Loser	Score
Men's singles third round	Daniil Medvedev (ROC) [2]	Fabio Fognini (ITA) [15]	6–2, 3–6, 6–2
Women's singles - Quarterfinals	Belinda Bencic (SUI) [9]	Anastasia Pavlyuchenkova (ROC) [13]	6–0, 3–6, 6–3
Men's singles third round	Novak Djokovic (SRB) [1]	Alejandro Davidovich Fokina (ESP) [16]	6–3, 6–1
Men's doubles - Quarterfinals	Nikola Mektić (CRO) [1] Mate Pavić (CRO) [1]	Ben McLachlan (JPN) [ITF] Kei Nishikori (JPN) [ITF]	6–3, 6–3
Mixed doubles first round	Nina Stojanović (SRB); Novak Djokovic (SRB)	Luisa Stefani (BRA); Marcelo Melo (BRA)	6–3, 6–4
Mixed doubles first round	Ena Shibahara (JPN); Ben McLachlan (JPN)	Yaroslava Shvedova (KAZ); Andrey Golubev (KAZ)	6–3, 7–6^{(7–3)}
Matches on Court 1
Event	Winner	Loser	Score
Women's singles - Quarterfinals	Elina Svitolina (UKR) [4]	Camila Giorgi (ITA)	6–4, 6–4
Men's singles third round	Kei Nishikori (JPN)	Ilya Ivashka (BLR)	7–6^{(9–7)}, 6–0
Men's singles third round	Alexander Zverev (GER) [4]	Nikoloz Basilashvili (GEO)	6–4, 7–6^{(7–5)}
Women's doubles - Quarterfinals	Belinda Bencic (SUI); Viktorija Golubic (SUI)	Ellen Perez (AUS); Samantha Stosur (AUS)	6–4, 6–4

== Day 6 (29 July) ==
- Seeds out:
  - Men's singles: Daniil Medvedev (ROC) [2], Ugo Humbert (FRA) [14]
  - Mixed doubles: Maria Sakkari (GRE) / Stefanos Tsitsipas (GRE) [2]
- Order of play

Matches on main courts
Matches in Ariake Coliseum
Event	Winner	Loser	Score
Women's singles - Semifinals	Belinda Bencic (SUI) [9]	Elena Rybakina (KAZ) [15]	7–6^{(7–2)}, 4–6, 6–3
Men's singles - Quarterfinals	Novak Djokovic (SRB) [1]	Kei Nishikori (JPN)	6–2, 6–0
Women's singles - Semifinals	Markéta Vondroušová (CZE)	Elina Svitolina (UKR) [4]	6–3, 6–1
Mixed doubles - Quarterfinals	Nina Stojanović (SRB); Novak Djokovic (SRB)	Laura Siegemund (GER); Kevin Krawietz (GER)	6–1, 6–2
Matches on Court 1
Event	Winner	Loser	Score
Men's singles - Quarterfinals	Karen Khachanov (ROC) [12]	Ugo Humbert (FRA) [14]	7–6^{(7–4)}, 4–6, 6–3
Men's singles - Quarterfinals	Pablo Carreño Busta (ESP) [6]	Daniil Medvedev (ROC) [2]	6–3, 7–6^{(7–5)}
Men's singles - Quarterfinals	Alexander Zverev (GER) [4]	Jérémy Chardy (FRA)	6–4, 6–1
Mixed doubles - Quarterfinals	Elena Vesnina (ROC); Aslan Karatsev (ROC)	Iga Świątek (POL); Łukasz Kubot (POL)	6–4, 6–4

== Day 7 (30 July) ==
- Order of play

Matches on main courts
Matches in Ariake Coliseum
Event	Winner	Loser	Score
Men's singles - Semifinals	Karen Khachanov (ROC) [12]	Pablo Carreño Busta (ESP) [6]	6–3, 6–3
Men's singles - Semifinals	Alexander Zverev (GER) [4]	Novak Djokovic (SRB) [1]	1–6, 6–3, 6–1
Men's doubles Gold Medal match	Nikola Mektić (CRO) [1] Mate Pavić (CRO) [1]	Marin Čilić (CRO); Ivan Dodig (CRO)	6–4, 3–6, [10–6]
Matches on Court 1
Event	Winner	Loser	Score
Men's doubles Bronze Medal Match	Marcus Daniell (NZL); Michael Venus (NZL)	Austin Krajicek (USA); Tennys Sandgren (USA)	7–6^{(7–3)}, 6–2
Mixed doubles - Semifinals	Anastasia Pavlyuchenkova (ROC) [4] Andrey Rublev (ROC) [4]	Ashleigh Barty (AUS); John Peers (AUS)	7–5, 4–6, [13–11]
Mixed doubles - Semifinals	Elena Vesnina (ROC); Aslan Karatsev (ROC)	Nina Stojanović (SRB); Novak Djokovic (SRB)	7–6^{(7–4)}, 7–5

== Day 8 (31 July) ==
- Seeds out:
  - Men's singles: Novak Djokovic (SRB) [1]
  - Women's singles: Elena Rybakina (KAZ) [15]
- Order of play

Matches on main courts
Matches in Ariake Coliseum
Event	Winner	Loser	Score
Men's singles Bronze Medal match	Pablo Carreño Busta (ESP) [6]	Novak Djokovic (SRB) [1]	6–4, 6–7^{(6–8)}, 6–3
Women's singles Bronze Medal match	Elina Svitolina (UKR) [4]	Elena Rybakina (KAZ) [15]	1–6, 7–6^{(7–5)}, 6–4
Women's singles Gold Medal match	Belinda Bencic (SUI) [9]	Markéta Vondroušová (CZE)	7–5, 2–6, 6–3
Matches on Court 1
Event	Winner	Loser	Score
Women's doubles Bronze Medal match	Laura Pigossi (BRA); Luisa Stefani (BRA)	Veronika Kudermetova (ROC); Elena Vesnina (ROC) [PR]	4–6, 6–4, [11–9]
Mixed doubles Bronze Medal match	Ashleigh Barty (AUS); John Peers (AUS)	Nina Stojanović (SRB); Novak Djokovic (SRB)	W.O.

== Day 9 (1 August) ==
- Seeds out:
  - Men's singles: Karen Khachanov (ROC) [12]
- Order of play

Matches on main courts
Matches in Ariake Coliseum
Event	Winner	Loser	Score
Women's doubles Gold Medal match	Barbora Krejčíková (CZE) [1] Kateřina Siniaková (CZE) [1]	Belinda Bencic (SUI); Viktorija Golubic (SUI)	7-5, 6-1
Men's singles Gold Medal match	Alexander Zverev (GER) [4]	Karen Khachanov (ROC) [12]	6–3, 6–1
Mixed doubles Gold Medal match	Anastasia Pavlyuchenkova (ROC) [4] Andrey Rublev (ROC) [4]	Elena Vesnina (ROC); Aslan Karatsev (ROC)	6–3, 6–7^{(5–7)}, [13–11]
