= Tennis at the 2020 Summer Olympics =

Tennis at the Games of the XXXII Olympiad
- Tennis pictogram for the 2020 Summer Olympics
- Venue: Ariake Tennis Park
- Dates: 24 July – 1 August 2021
- No. of events: 5
- Competitors: 191 from 42 nations

Tennis at the 2020 Summer Olympics
- Edition: 18th
- Surface: Hard

Champions

Men's singles
- Alexander Zverev (GER)

Women's singles
- Belinda Bencic (SUI)

Men's doubles
- Nikola Mektić & Mate Pavić (CRO)

Women's doubles
- Barbora Krejčíková & Kateřina Siniaková (CZE)

Mixed doubles
- Anastasia Pavlyuchenkova & Andrey Rublev (ROC)
- Summer Olympics

Tennis at the 2020 Summer Olympics in Tokyo was held between 24 July and 1 August 2021 at the Ariake Tennis Park.

The tournament featured 191 players in five events: singles and doubles for both men and women and mixed doubles. The hard-court Deco Turf surface at the 2020 Tokyo Olympic Games was chosen by the Tokyo Organizing Committee. This marked the fifth time that this type of surface was utilized for the Olympic Games.

The format at the 2020 Tokyo Olympic Games was a single-elimination tournament with men's and women's singles draws consisting of 64 players. There were six rounds of competition in singles, five rounds in doubles (draw size of 32), and four rounds in mixed doubles (draw size of 16). Players and teams reaching the semifinals were assured of competing for a medal with the two losing semifinalists competing for the bronze medal. All singles matches were best of three sets with a standard tiebreak (first to seven points) in every set, including the final set. In all doubles competition, a match tiebreak (first to ten points) was played instead of a third set.

== Medal summary ==
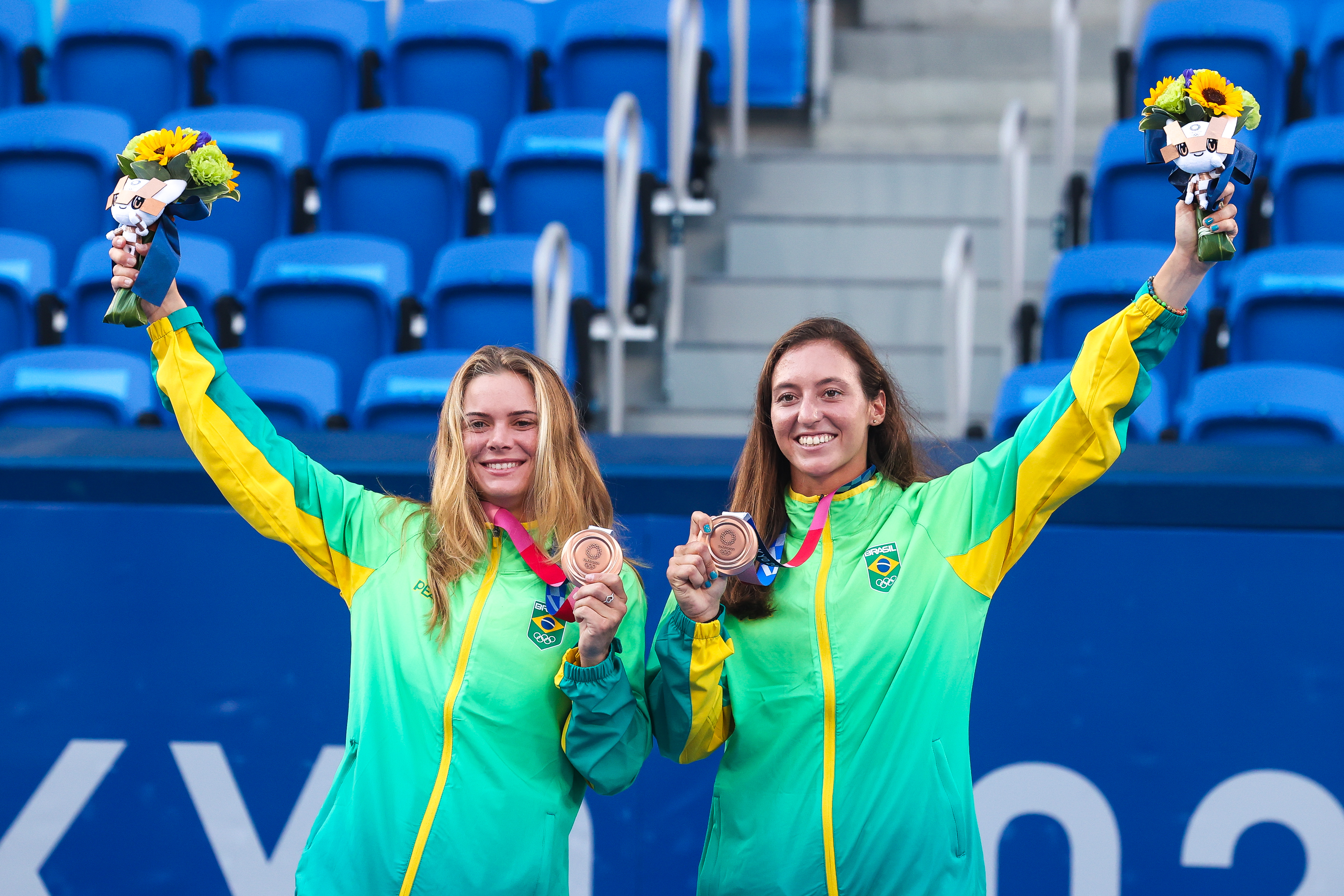
Laura Pigossi and Luisa Stefani from Brazil, winners of the women’s doubles bronze medal

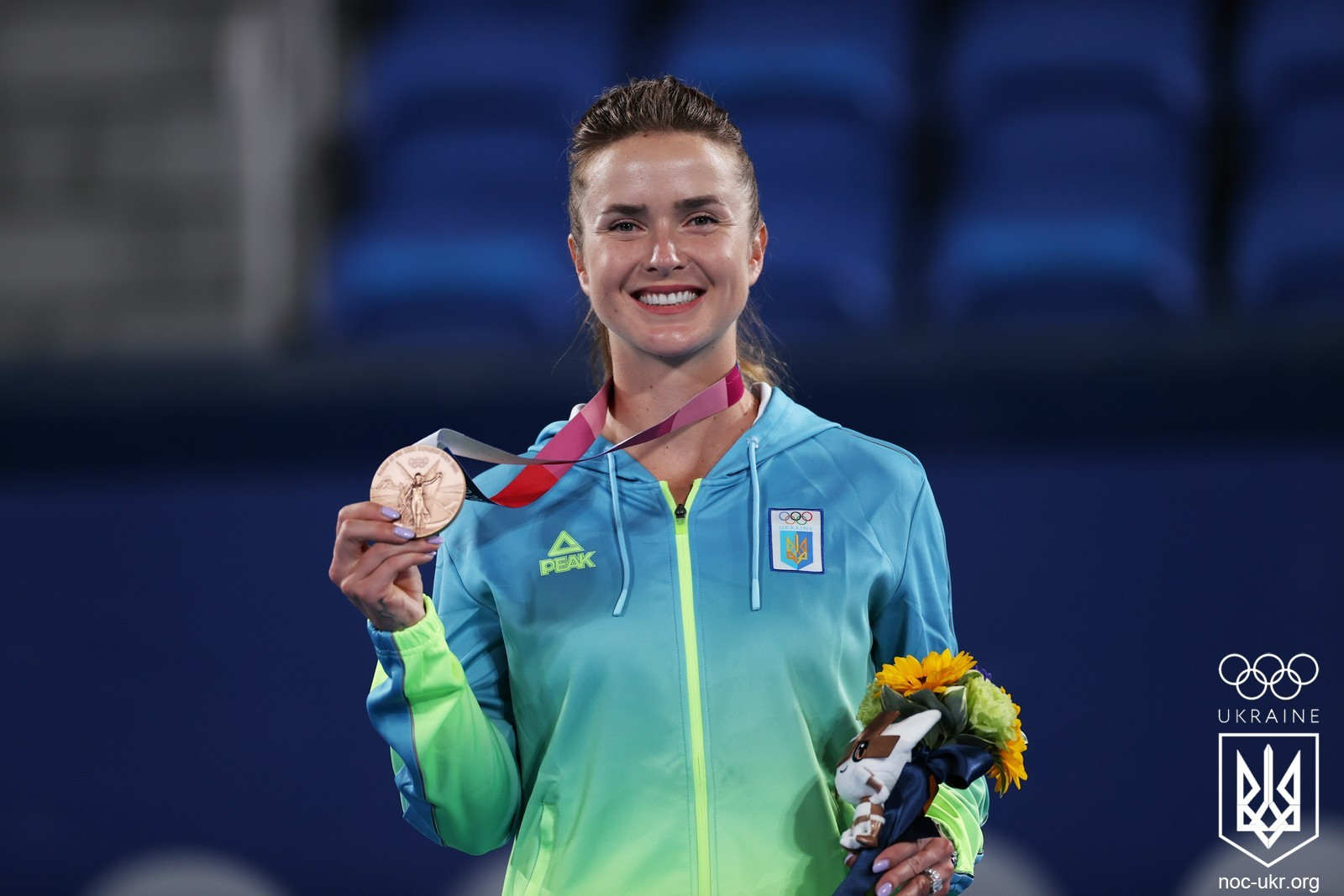
Ukraine Elina Svitolina with her bronze Olympic medal

In men's singles, Alexander Zverev of Germany won the gold medal by defeating Karen Khachanov of the Russian Olympic Committee, 6–3, 6–1. In men's doubles, Nikola Mektić and Mate Pavić of Croatia defeated compatriots Marin Čilić and Ivan Dodig 6–4, 3–6, 10–6.

In women's singles, Belinda Bencic of Switzerland won the gold medal over Markéta Vondroušová of the Czech Republic 7–5, 2–6, 6–3. In women's doubles, Barbora Krejčíková and Kateřina Siniaková of the Czech Republic defeated Bencic and Viktorija Golubic of Switzerland 7–5, 6–1.

In mixed doubles, Andrey Rublev and Anastasia Pavlyuchenkova of the Russian Olympic Committee defeated compatriots Elena Vesnina and Aslan Karatsev, 6–3, 6–7 (5), [13–11].

Elena Vesnina with her mixed doubles silver olympic medal

=== Events ===
Event	Gold	Silver	Bronze
Men's singles	Alexander Zverev; Germany	Karen Khachanov; ROC	Pablo Carreño Busta; Spain
Men's doubles	Croatia; Nikola Mektić; Mate Pavić	Croatia; Marin Čilić; Ivan Dodig	New Zealand; Marcus Daniell; Michael Venus
Women's singles	Belinda Bencic; Switzerland	Markéta Vondroušová; Czech Republic	Elina Svitolina; Ukraine
Women's doubles	Czech Republic; Barbora Krejčíková; Kateřina Siniaková	Switzerland; Belinda Bencic; Viktorija Golubic	Brazil; Laura Pigossi; Luisa Stefani
Mixed doubles	ROC (ROC); Anastasia Pavlyuchenkova; Andrey Rublev	ROC (ROC); Elena Vesnina; Aslan Karatsev	Australia; Ashleigh Barty; John Peers

=== Medals table ===
Rank	NOC	Gold	Silver	Bronze	Total
1	ROC	1	2	0	3
2	Croatia	1	1	0	2
2	Czech Republic	1	1	0	2
2	Switzerland	1	1	0	2
5	Germany	1	0	0	1
6	Australia	0	0	1	1
6	Brazil	0	0	1	1
6	New Zealand	0	0	1	1
6	Spain	0	0	1	1
6	Ukraine	0	0	1	1
Totals (10 entries)		5	5	5	15

== Qualification ==
To be eligible, a player must meet certain requirements related to play on Davis Cup or Billie Jean King Cup teams. Qualification for the singles competitions is based primarily on the world rankings of 14 June 2021, with 56 players entering each of the men's and women's events (limited to four per National Olympic Committee (NOC)). Six of the remaining eight slots are to be allocated by continent for NOCs with no other qualifiers. The final two spots are reserved, one for the host nation and one for a previous Olympic gold medalist or Grand Slam champion. In the men's and women's doubles competitions, 32 teams are scheduled to compete. Up to 10 places are reserved for players in the top 10 of the doubles ranking, who could select any player from their NOC ranked in the top 300 in either singles or doubles. The remaining slots are allocated by combined rankings, with preference given to singles players once the total player quota is met. One team per gender is to be reserved for the host nation if none has already become eligible otherwise. No quota spots are available for mixed doubles; instead, all teams will consist of players already entered in the singles or doubles. The top 15 combined ranking teams and the host nation are eligible.

Andy Murray of Great Britain was the two-time defending champion in men's singles, but withdrew before his first-round match due to a quadriceps strain. Monica Puig of Puerto Rico was the defending champion in women's singles, but did not return to defend her title in order to recover from surgery. The United States had the most withdrawals of any nation, with 11.

== Schedule ==
Date	24 July	25 July	26 July	27 July	28 July	29 July	30 July	31 July	1 August
Day	Saturday	Sunday	Monday	Tuesday	Wednesday	Thursday	Friday	Saturday	Sunday
Start time	11:00	11:00	11:00	11:00	11:00	15:00	15:00	15:00	15:00
Men's singles	Round of 64		Round of 32		Round of 16	Quarterfinals	Semifinals	Bronze	Final
Women's singles	Round of 64		Round of 32	Round of 16	Quarterfinals	Semifinals	—	Bronze & final	—
Men's doubles	Round of 32		Round of 16		Quarterfinals	Semifinals	Bronze & final	—	—
Women's doubles	Round of 32		Round of 16		Quarterfinals	Semifinals	—	Bronze	Final
Mixed doubles	—	—	—	—	Round of 16	Quarterfinals	Semifinals	Bronze	Final

== Participating nations ==
- Argentina (7)
- Australia (10)
- Austria (2)
- Belarus (3)
- Belgium (4)
- Bolivia (1)
- Brazil (7)
- Canada (4)
- Chile (1)
- China (5)
- Colombia (4)
- Croatia (6)
- Czech Republic (6)
- Egypt (2)
- Estonia (1)
- France (10)
- Georgia (1)
- Germany (9)
- Great Britain (6)
- Greece (2)
- India (3)
- Italy (6)
- **Japan (11)***
- Kazakhstan (7)
- Latvia (2)
- Mexico (2)
- Netherlands (4)
- New Zealand (2)
- Paraguay (1)
- Peru (1)
- Poland (6)
- Portugal (2)
- ROC (8)
- Romania (3)
- Serbia (5)
- Slovakia (3)
- South Korea (1)
- Spain (8)
- Sweden (1)
- Switzerland (2)
- Chinese Taipei (5)
- Tunisia (1)
- Ukraine (4)
- United States (11)
- Uzbekistan (1)

*Host nation indicated in bold.

== See also ==
- Tennis at the 2018 Asian Games
- Tennis at the 2018 Summer Youth Olympics
- Tennis at the 2019 African Games
- Tennis at the 2019 Pan American Games
- Wheelchair tennis at the 2020 Summer Paralympics
