= Croatia at the 2020 Summer Olympics =

- IOC code: CRO
- NOC: Croatian Olympic Committee
- Website: www.hoo.hr (in Croatian and English)

in Tokyo, Japan July 23, 2021 – August 8, 2021
- Competitors: 60 in 16 sports
- Flag bearers (opening): Sandra Perković; Josip Glasnović
- Flag bearer (closing): Andro Bušlje
- Medals Ranked 26th: Gold 3 Silver 3 Bronze 3 Total 9

Summer Olympics appearances (overview)
- 1992; 1996; 2000; 2004; 2008; 2012; 2016; 2020; 2024

Other related appearances
- Austria (1900); Yugoslavia (1920–1988)

Croatia competed at the 2020 Summer Olympics in Tokyo. Originally scheduled to take place from 24 July to 9 August 2020, the Games were postponed to 23 July to 8 August 2021, because of the COVID-19 pandemic. It was the nation's eighth consecutive appearance at the Summer Olympics.

Croatian squad of 59 athletes, the smallest delegation since Barcelona 1992, was named on 5 July 2021.

== Medalists ==
Medal	Name	Sport	Event	Date
Gold	Matea Jelić	Taekwondo	Women's −67 kg	26 July
Gold	Martin Sinković; Valent Sinković	Rowing	Men's coxless pair	29 July
Gold	Mate Pavić; Nikola Mektić	Tennis	Men's doubles	30 July
Silver	Marin Čilić; Ivan Dodig	Tennis	Men's doubles	30 July
Silver	Tonči Stipanović	Sailing	Men's Laser	1 August
Silver	Tin Srbić	Gymnastics	Men's horizontal bar	3 August
Bronze	Toni Kanaet	Taekwondo	Men's –80 kg	26 July
Bronze	Damir Martin	Rowing	Men's single sculls	30 July
Bronze	Ivan Huklek	Wrestling	Men's –87kg	4 August

== Competitors ==
The following is the list of number of competitors participating in the Games:

Sport	Men	Women	Total
Athletics	1	6	7
Boxing	1	1	2
Canoeing	1	2	3
Cycling	1	0	1
Gymnastics	1	1	2
Judo	0	3	3
Karate	1	0	1
Rowing	3	0	3
Sailing	3	1	4
Shooting	3	1	4
Swimming	1	1	2
Table tennis	3	0	3
Taekwondo	2	2	4
Tennis	4	2	6
Water polo	13	0	13
Wrestling	2	0	2
Total	40	20	60

== Athletics ==
Croatian athletes further achieved the entry standards, either by qualifying time or by world ranking, in the following track and field events (up to a maximum of 3 athletes in each event):

Key

- Note–Ranks given for track events are within the athlete's heat only
- Q = Qualified for the next round
- q = Qualified for the next round as a fastest loser or, in field events, by position without achieving the qualifying target
- NR = National record
- N/A = Round not applicable for the event
- Bye = Athlete not required to compete in round

Track & road events

Athlete	Event	Final	
Athlete	Event	Result	Rank
Bojana Bjeljac	Women's marathon	2:39:32	53
Matea Parlov Koštro	Women's marathon	2:33:18	21

Field events

Athlete	Event	Qualification		Final	
Athlete	Event	Distance	Position	Distance	Position
Filip Mihaljević	Men's shot put	20.67	15	Did not advance	
Ana Šimić	Women's high jump	1.86	25	Did not advance	
Sandra Perković	Women's discus throw	63.75	3 q	65.01	4
Marija Tolj	Women's discus throw	61.48	13	Did not advance	
Sara Kolak	Women's javelin throw	NM	—	Did not advance	

== Boxing ==
Croatia entered two boxers into the Olympic tournament. Youth Olympic medalist Luka Plantić (men's light heavyweight) and Nikolina Čačić (women's featherweight) secured spots by winning their quarterfinal and box-off matches, respectively, at the 2020 European Qualification Tournament in Villebon-sur-Yvette, France.

Athlete	Event	Round of 32	Round of 16	Quarterfinals	Semifinals	Final	
Athlete	Event	Opposition Result	Opposition Result	Opposition Result	Opposition Result	Opposition Result	Rank
Luka Plantić	Men's light heavyweight	Al-Hindawi (JOR); W 3–2	Romero (MEX); L 1–4	Did not advance			
Nikolina Čačić	Women's featherweight	Ramirez (USA); W 5–0	Veyre (CAN); L 0–5	Did not advance			

== Canoeing ==
=== Slalom ===
Croatia qualified one canoeist for the men's C-1 class by finishing in the top eleven at the 2019 ICF Canoe Slalom World Championships in La Seu d'Urgell, Spain, marking the country's recurrence to the sport after an eight-year absence.

Athlete	Event	Preliminary						Semifinal		Final	
Athlete	Event	Run 1	Rank	Run 2	Rank	Best	Rank	Time	Rank	Time	Rank
Matija Marinić	Men's C-1	100.33	5	101.66	5	100.33	5	109.94	11	Did not advance	

=== Sprint ===
Croatia qualified a single boat (women's K-1 500 m) for the Games by virtue of placing 2nd at the 2021 European Qualification Regatta in Szeged, Hungary. A further boat qualified (women's C-1 200 m) by virtue of winning the World Olympic Qualifier in Barnaul, Russia. This signified the first time that Croatia has qualified female canoeists.

Athlete	Event	Heat		Quarterfinal		Semifinal		Final	
Athlete	Event	Time	Rank	Time	Rank	Time	Rank	Time	Rank
Vanesa Tot	Women's C-1 200 m	49.280	6 QF	48.375	5	Did not advance			
Anamaria Govorčinović	Women's K-1 200 m	42.901	3 QF	43.307	3	Did not advance			
Anamaria Govorčinović	Women's K-1 500 m	1:52.015	5 QF	1:53.967	4	Did not advance			

Qualification Legend: FA = Qualify to final (medal); FB = Qualify to final B (non-medal)

== Cycling ==
=== Road ===
Croatia received a spare berth, freed up by withdrawal of Sweden, to send one rider competing in the men's Olympic road race, as the highest-ranked nation for men, not yet qualified, in the UCI World Ranking.

Athlete	Event	Time	Rank
Josip Rumac	Men's road race	Did not finish	

== Gymnastics ==
=== Artistic ===
Croatia entered two artistic gymnasts into the Olympic competition. Tin Srbić secured one of the two places available for individual-based gymnasts, neither part of the team nor qualified through the all-around, in the horizontal bar exercise at the 2019 World Championships in Stuttgart, Germany. On the women's side, Rio 2016 Olympian Ana Đerek received a spare berth from the apparatus event, as one of the twelve highest-ranked eligible gymnasts, not yet qualified, at the same tournament.

Men

Athlete	Event	Qualification								Final							
Athlete	Event	Apparatus						Total	Rank	Apparatus						Total	Rank
Athlete	Event	F	PH	R	V	PB	HB	Total	Rank	F	PH	R	V	PB	HB	Total	Rank
Tin Srbić	Horizontal bar	—N/a					14.633	14.633	3 Q	—N/a					14.900	14.900	2nd place, silver medalist(s)

Women

Athlete	Event	Qualification						Final					
Athlete	Event	Apparatus				Total	Rank	Apparatus				Total	Rank
Athlete	Event	V	UB	BB	F	Total	Rank	V	UB	BB	F	Total	Rank
Ana Đerek	Balance beam	—N/a		11.633	—N/a	11.633	74	Did not advance					
Ana Đerek	Floor	—N/a			12.433	12.433	58	Did not advance					

== Judo ==
Croatia entered three female judokas into the Olympic tournament based on the International Judo Federation Olympic Qualification Rankings.

Athlete	Event	Round of 32	Round of 16	Quarterfinals	Semifinals	Repechage	Final / BM	
Athlete	Event	Opposition Result	Opposition Result	Opposition Result	Opposition Result	Opposition Result	Opposition Result	Rank
Barbara Matić	Women's –70 kg	Bye	Timo (POR); W 10–00	Polleres (AUT); L 00–01	Did not advance	Bellandi (ITA); W 10–00	Taimazova (ROC); L 00–01	5
Karla Prodan	Women's –78 kg	Peković (MNE); W 01–00	Antomarchi (CUB); L 00–01	Did not advance				
Ivana Maranić	Women's +78 kg	Jablonskytė (LTU); L 00–11	Did not advance					

== Karate ==
Croatia entered one karateka into the inaugural Olympic tournament. 2018 world champion Ivan Kvesić qualified directly for the men's kumite +75-kg category by finishing among the top four karateka at the end of the combined WKF Olympic Rankings.

Athlete	Event	Group stage					Semifinals	Final	
Athlete	Event	Opposition Result	Opposition Result	Opposition Result	Opposition Result	Rank	Opposition Result	Opposition Result	Rank
Ivan Kvesić	Men's +75 kg	Hamedi (KSA); W 3–2	Ganjzadeh (IRI); L 1–3	Gaysinsky (CAN); L 1–4	Irr (USA); W 3–1	3	Did not advance		

== Rowing ==
Croatia qualified two boats for each of the following rowing classes into the Olympic regatta. Rowing crews in the men's single sculls and men's coxless pair confirmed Olympic places for their boats at the 2019 FISA World Championships in Ottensheim, Austria

Athlete	Event	Heats		Repechage		Quarterfinals		Semifinals		Final	
Athlete	Event	Time	Rank	Time	Rank	Time	Rank	Time	Rank	Time	Rank
Damir Martin	Men's single sculls	7:09.17	1 QF	Bye		7:17.71	1 SA/B	6:45.27	2 FA	6:42.58	3rd place, bronze medalist(s)
Martin Sinković; Valent Sinković	Men's coxless pair	6:32.41	1 SA/B	Bye		—N/a		6:15.63	1 FA	6:15.29	1st place, gold medalist(s)

Qualification Legend: FA=Final A (medal); FB=Final B (non-medal); FC=Final C (non-medal); FD=Final D (non-medal); FE=Final E (non-medal); FF=Final F (non-medal); SA/B=Semifinals A/B; SC/D=Semifinals C/D; SE/F=Semifinals E/F; QF=Quarterfinals; R=Repechage

== Sailing ==
Croatian sailors qualified one boat in each of the following classes through the 2018 Sailing World Championships, the class-associated Worlds, and the continental regattas.

Athlete	Event	Race													Net points	Final rank
Athlete	Event	1	2	3	4	5	6	7	8	9	10	11	12	M*	Net points	Final rank
Tonči Stipanović	Men's Laser	15	6	3	~~22~~	13	4	5	11	7	10	—N/a		8	82	2nd place, silver medalist(s)
Mihovil Fantela; Šime Fantela	Men's 49er	4	14	8	13	13	6	14	3	~~DSQ~~	1	10	2	1	106	8
Elena Vorobeva	Women's Laser Radial	11	2	13	~~41~~	16	15	7	21	18	23	—N/a		EL	126	12

M = Medal race; EL = Eliminated – did not advance into the medal race; STP = Standard Penalty (a penalty applied by the Race Committee); DSQ = Disqualification

== Shooting ==
Croatian shooters achieved quota places for the following events by virtue of their best finishes at the 2018 ISSF World Championships, the 2019 ISSF World Cup series, European Championships or Games, and European Qualifying Tournament, as long as they obtained a minimum qualifying score (MQS) by May 31, 2020.

Athlete	Event	Qualification		Semifinal		Final	
Athlete	Event	Points	Rank	Points	Rank	Points	Rank
Josip Glasnović	Men's trap	120	22	—N/a		Did not advance	
Petar Gorša	Men's 10 m air rifle	626.5	16	—N/a		Did not advance	
Petar Gorša	Men's 50 m rifle 3 positions	1176	7 Q	—N/a		427.2	5
Miran Maričić	Men's 10 m air rifle	625.0	25	—N/a		Did not advance	
Miran Maričić	Men's 50 m rifle 3 positions	1178	5 Q	—N/a		416.2	6
Snježana Pejčić	Women's 10 m air rifle	622.6	31	—N/a		Did not advance	
Snježana Pejčić	Women's 50 m rifle 3 positions	1169	10	—N/a		Did not advance	
Petar Gorša; Snježana Pejčić	Mixed 10 m air rifle team	624.2	17	Did not advance			

== Swimming ==
Croatian swimmers further achieved qualifying standards in the following events (up to a maximum of 2 swimmers in each event at the Olympic Qualifying Time (OQT), and potentially 1 at the Olympic Selection Time (OST)):

Athlete	Event	Heat		Semifinal		Final	
Athlete	Event	Time	Rank	Time	Rank	Time	Rank
Nikola Miljenić	Men's 50 m freestyle	22.14	=19	Did not advance			
Nikola Miljenić	Men's 100 m freestyle	49.25	28	Did not advance			
Nikola Miljenić	Men's 100 m butterfly	52.68	40	Did not advance			
Ema Rajić	Women's 50 m freestyle	26.49	=45	Did not advance			
Ema Rajić	Women's 100 m breaststroke	1:10.02	33	Did not advance			

== Table tennis ==
Croatia entered three athletes into the table tennis competition at the Games. The men's team secured a berth by advancing to the quarterfinal round of the 2020 World Olympic Qualification Event in Gondomar, Portugal, permitting a maximum of two starters to compete in the men's singles tournament.

Athlete	Event	Preliminary	Round 1	Round 2	Round 3	Round of 16	Quarterfinals	Semifinals	Final / BM	
Athlete	Event	Opposition Result	Opposition Result	Opposition Result	Opposition Result	Opposition Result	Opposition Result	Opposition Result	Opposition Result	Rank
Andrej Gaćina	Men's singles	Bye	Fanny (TOG); W 4–0	Lebesson (FRA); L 0–4	Did not advance					
Tomislav Pucar	Men's singles	Bye		Tokić (SLO); L 0–4	Did not advance					
Andrej Gaćina; Frane Tomislav Kojić; Tomislav Pucar	Men's team	—N/a				Chinese Taipei; L 0–3	Did not advance			

== Taekwondo ==
Croatia entered three athletes into the taekwondo competition at the Games. Kristina Tomić (women's 49 kg) and Matea Jelić (women's 67 kg) qualified directly for their respective weight classes by finishing among the top five taekwondo practitioners at the end of the WT Olympic Rankings. With the 2019 World Taekwondo Grand Slam winner already qualified in the men's welterweight category (80 kg), 2018 European champion Toni Kanaet secured a third spot for the Croatian roster, as the next highest-placed eligible taekwondo practitioner in the rankings. Meanwhile, Ivan Šapina scored a semifinal victory in the men's heavyweight category (+80 kg) to book the remaining spot on the Croatian taekwondo squad at the 2021 European Qualification Tournament in Sofia, Bulgaria.

Athlete	Event	Round of 16	Quarterfinals	Semifinals	Repechage	Final / BM	
Athlete	Event	Opposition Result	Opposition Result	Opposition Result	Opposition Result	Opposition Result	Rank
Toni Kanaet	Men's −80 kg	Martínez (ESP); W 21–15	Khramtsov (ROC); L 0–22 PTG	Did not advance	Sawadogo (BUR); W 30–10	Rafalovich (UZB); W 24–18	3rd place, bronze medalist(s)
Ivan Šapina	Men's +80 kg	Sansores (MEX); W 6–4	Sun Hy (CHN); L 6–8	Did not advance			
Kristina Tomić	Women's −49 kg	Ramírez (COL); L 5–25	Did not advance				
Matea Jelić	Women's −67 kg	Lee (HAI); W 22–2	Titoneli (BRA); W 30–9 PTG	McPherson (USA); W 15–4	Bye	Williams (GBR); W 25–22	1st place, gold medalist(s)

== Tennis ==
Croatia qualified six tennis players.

Men

Athlete	Event	Round of 64	Round of 32	Round of 16	Quarterfinals	Semifinals	Final / BM	
Athlete	Event	Opposition Score	Opposition Score	Opposition Score	Opposition Score	Opposition Score	Opposition Score	Rank
Marin Čilić	Singles	Menezes (BRA); W 6–7^{(5–7)}, 7–5, 7–6^{(9–7)}	Carreño (ESP); L 7–5, 4–6, 4–6	Did not advance				
Marin Čilić; Ivan Dodig	Doubles	—N/a	Daniel / Nishioka (JPN); W 6–2, 6–4	Ram / Tiafoe (USA); W 6–3, 7–5	Murray / Salisbury (GBR); W 4–6, 7–6^{(7–2)}, [10–7]	Daniell / Venus (NZL); W 6–2, 6–2	Mektić / Pavić (CRO); L 4–6, 6–3, [6–10]	2nd place, silver medalist(s)
Nikola Mektić; Mate Pavić	Doubles	—N/a	Demoliner / Melo (BRA); W 7–6^{(8–6)}, 6–4	Musetti / Sonego (ITA); W 7–5, 6–7^{(5–7)}, [10–7]	McLachlan / Nishikori (JPN); W 6–3, 6–3	Krajicek / Sandgren (USA); W 6–4, 6–4	Čilić / Dodig (CRO); W 6–4, 3–6, [10–6]	1st place, gold medalist(s)

Women

Athlete	Event	Round of 64	Round of 32	Round of 16	Quarterfinals	Semifinals	Final / BM	
Athlete	Event	Opposition Score	Opposition Score	Opposition Score	Opposition Score	Opposition Score	Opposition Score	Rank
Donna Vekić	Singles	Garcia (FRA); W 6–2, 6–7^{(2–7)}, 6–3	Sabalenka (BLR); W 6–4, 3–6, 7–6^{(7–3)}	Rybakina (KAZ); L 6–7^{(3–7)}, 4–6	did not advance			
Darija Jurak; Donna Vekić	Doubles	—N/a	Withdrew due to Jurak's positive COVID-19 test					

Mixed

Athlete	Event	Round of 16	Quarterfinals	Semifinals	Final / BM	
Athlete	Event	Opposition Score	Opposition Score	Opposition Score	Opposition Score	Rank
Darija Jurak; Ivan Dodig	Doubles	Pavlyuchenkova / Rublev (ROC); L 7–5, 4–6, [9–11]	Did not advance			

== Water polo ==
Summary

Key:
- FT – After full time.
- P – Match decided by penalty-shootout.

Team	Event	Group stage						Quarterfinal	Semifinal	Final / BM	
Team	Event	Opposition Score	Opposition Score	Opposition Score	Opposition Score	Opposition Score	Rank	Opposition Score	Opposition Score	Opposition Score	Rank
Croatia men's	Men's tournament	Kazakhstan; W 23–7	Australia; L 8–11	Montenegro; W 13–8	Serbia; W 14–12	Spain; L 4–8	2	Hungary; L 11–15	Montenegro; W 12–10	United States; W 14–11	5

=== Men's tournament ===
Croatian men's water polo team qualified for the Olympics by winning the third-place match against Russia by a penalty shot at the 2020 Men's Water Polo Olympic Qualification Tournament.

Team roster

Croatia's final squad was announced on 8 July 2021.

Head coach: Ivica Tucak

No.	Player	Pos.	L/R	Height	Weight	Date of birth (age)	Apps	OG/ Goals	Club	Ref
1	Marko Bijač	GK	R	2.01 m (6 ft 7 in)	88 kg (194 lb)	12 January 1991 (aged 30)	96	1/0	(Greece) Olympiacos	
2	Marko Macan	CB	R	1.95 m (6 ft 5 in)	109 kg (240 lb)	26 April 1993 (aged 28)	109	1/0	(Germany) Waspo 98 Hannover	
3	Loren Fatović	D	R	1.85 m (6 ft 1 in)	84 kg (185 lb)	16 November 1996 (aged 24)	70	0/0	(Croatia) Jug Dubrovnik	
4	Luka Lončar	CF	R	1.95 m (6 ft 5 in)	106 kg (234 lb)	26 June 1987 (aged 34)	182	1/4	(Italy) Pro Recco	
5	Maro Joković	D	L	2.03 m (6 ft 8 in)	96 kg (212 lb)	1 October 1987 (aged 33)	292	3/27	(Italy) Brescia	
6	Luka Bukić	D	R	1.95 m (6 ft 5 in)	90 kg (198 lb)	30 April 1994 (aged 27)	55	1/5	(Croatia) Jadran Split	
7	Ante Vukičević	D	R	1.87 m (6 ft 2 in)	95 kg (209 lb)	24 February 1993 (aged 28)	65	0/0	(France) Marseille	
8	Andro Bušlje (C)	CB	R	1.99 m (6 ft 6 in)	115 kg (254 lb)	4 January 1986 (aged 35)	360	3/14	(Greece) Olympiacos	
9	Lovre Miloš	D	R	1.96 m (6 ft 5 in)	94 kg (207 lb)	5 April 1994 (aged 27)	41	0/0	(Croatia) HAVK Mladost	
10	Josip Vrlić	CF	R	1.98 m (6 ft 6 in)	130 kg (287 lb)	25 April 1986 (aged 35)	44	1/4	(Croatia) HAVK Mladost	
11	Paulo Obradović	CB	R	1.90 m (6 ft 3 in)	100 kg (220 lb)	9 March 1986 (aged 35)	180	1/5	(Croatia) Jug Dubrovnik	
12	Xavier García	D	L	1.98 m (6 ft 6 in)	92 kg (203 lb)	5 January 1984 (aged 37)	385	4/25	(Croatia) Jug Dubrovnik	
13	Ivan Marcelić	GK	R	1.92 m (6 ft 4 in)	106 kg (234 lb)	18 February 1994 (aged 27)	85	0/0	(Croatia) HAVK Mladost	
Average				1.95 m (6 ft 5 in)	100 kg (220 lb)	31 years, 67 days	151			

Note: Age as of 23 July 2021
Source: Croatia Men | Tokyo 2020 Olympics Archived 2021-07-22 at the Wayback Machine

Group play

Pos	Team	Pld	W	D	L	GF	GA	GD	Pts	Qualification
1	Spain	5	5	0	0	61	31	+30	10	Quarterfinals
2	Croatia	5	3	0	2	62	46	+16	6 (Note: Croatia 14–12 Serbia)	Quarterfinals
3	Serbia	5	3	0	2	70	46	+24	6	Quarterfinals
4	Montenegro	5	2	0	3	54	56	−2	4 (Note: Australia 10–15 Montenegro)	Quarterfinals
5	Australia	5	2	0	3	49	60	−11	4	
6	Kazakhstan	5	0	0	5	35	92	−57	0	

Source: Tokyo 2020 and FINA
Rules for classification: 1) Points; 2) Head-to-head points; 3) Head-to-head goal difference; 4) Head-to-head goals scored; 5) Goal difference.
Notes:

25 July 2021; 19:50 v	Report	Croatia	23–7	Kazakhstan	Tokyo Tatsumi International Swimming Center; Referees: Dion Willis (RSA), Frank Ohme (GER)
25 July 2021; 19:50 v	Report	Score by quarters: 4–1, 6–3, 8–1, 5–2			Tokyo Tatsumi International Swimming Center; Referees: Dion Willis (RSA), Frank Ohme (GER)
25 July 2021; 19:50 v	Report	Joković 5	Goals	Vuksanović 3	Tokyo Tatsumi International Swimming Center; Referees: Dion Willis (RSA), Frank Ohme (GER)

27 July 2021; 19:50 v	Report	Australia	11–8	Croatia	Tokyo Tatsumi International Swimming Center; Referees: Frank Ohme (GER), Michael Goldenberg (USA)
27 July 2021; 19:50 v	Report	Score by quarters: 3–3, 2–0, 2–3, 4–2			Tokyo Tatsumi International Swimming Center; Referees: Frank Ohme (GER), Michael Goldenberg (USA)
27 July 2021; 19:50 v	Report	Campbell 3	Goals	Joković 3	Tokyo Tatsumi International Swimming Center; Referees: Frank Ohme (GER), Michael Goldenberg (USA)

29 July 2021; 15:30 v	Report	Croatia	13–8	Montenegro	Tokyo Tatsumi International Swimming Center; Referees: Arkadiy Voevodin (RUS), György Kun (HUN)
29 July 2021; 15:30 v	Report	Score by quarters: 1–1, 6–4, 4–3, 2–0			Tokyo Tatsumi International Swimming Center; Referees: Arkadiy Voevodin (RUS), György Kun (HUN)
29 July 2021; 15:30 v	Report	Fatović 3	Goals	three players 2	Tokyo Tatsumi International Swimming Center; Referees: Arkadiy Voevodin (RUS), György Kun (HUN)

31 July 2021; 15:30 v	Report	Croatia	14–12	Serbia	Tokyo Tatsumi International Swimming Center; Referees: Michael Goldenberg (USA), Michiel Zwart (NED)
31 July 2021; 15:30 v	Report	Score by quarters: 5–3, 1–1, 4–4, 4–4			Tokyo Tatsumi International Swimming Center; Referees: Michael Goldenberg (USA), Michiel Zwart (NED)
31 July 2021; 15:30 v	Report	Joković, Obradović 4	Goals	Jakšić 3	Tokyo Tatsumi International Swimming Center; Referees: Michael Goldenberg (USA), Michiel Zwart (NED)

2 August 2021; 15:30 v	Report	Spain	8–4	Croatia	Tokyo Tatsumi International Swimming Center; Referees: Georgios Stavridis (GRE), György Kun (HUN)
2 August 2021; 15:30 v	Report	Score by quarters: 2–1, 1–0, 4–2, 1–1			Tokyo Tatsumi International Swimming Center; Referees: Georgios Stavridis (GRE), György Kun (HUN)
2 August 2021; 15:30 v	Report	Granados 2	Goals	Bukić 2	Tokyo Tatsumi International Swimming Center; Referees: Georgios Stavridis (GRE), György Kun (HUN)

Quarterfinal

4 August 2021; 19:50 v	Report	Hungary	15–11	Croatia	Tokyo Tatsumi International Swimming Center; Referees: Sébastien Dervieux (FRA), Frank Ohme (GER)
4 August 2021; 19:50 v	Report	Score by quarters: 2–3, 5–2, 4–3, 4–3			Tokyo Tatsumi International Swimming Center; Referees: Sébastien Dervieux (FRA), Frank Ohme (GER)
4 August 2021; 19:50 v	Report	Manhercz 7	Goals	Bukić 4	Tokyo Tatsumi International Swimming Center; Referees: Sébastien Dervieux (FRA), Frank Ohme (GER)

Classification semifinal

6 August 2021; 14:00 v	Report	Montenegro	10–12	Croatia	Tokyo Tatsumi International Swimming Center; Referees: Viktor Salnichenko (KAZ), György Kun (HUN)
6 August 2021; 14:00 v	Report	Score by quarters: 0–1, 4–5, 3–3, 3–3			Tokyo Tatsumi International Swimming Center; Referees: Viktor Salnichenko (KAZ), György Kun (HUN)
6 August 2021; 14:00 v	Report	Ivović 3	Goals	Vukičević 3	Tokyo Tatsumi International Swimming Center; Referees: Viktor Salnichenko (KAZ), György Kun (HUN)

Fifth place game

8 August 2021; 11:00 v	Report	Croatia	14–11	United States	Tokyo Tatsumi International Swimming Center; Referees: Alessandro Severo (ITA), György Kun (HUN)
8 August 2021; 11:00 v	Report	Score by quarters: 2–3, 4–2, 4–2, 4–4			Tokyo Tatsumi International Swimming Center; Referees: Alessandro Severo (ITA), György Kun (HUN)
8 August 2021; 11:00 v	Report	Bukić 3	Goals	five players 2	Tokyo Tatsumi International Swimming Center; Referees: Alessandro Severo (ITA), György Kun (HUN)

== Wrestling ==
Croatia qualified two wrestlers for each of the following classes into the Olympic competition. One of them granted an Olympic license by advancing to the top two finals of the men's Greco-Roman 77 kg at the 2021 European Qualification Tournament in Budapest, Hungary, while another Croatian wrestler claimed one of the remaining slots in the men's Greco-Roman 87 kg at the 2021 World Qualification Tournament in Sofia, Bulgaria.

On 21 November 2025, Zurabi Datunashvili's appeal was rejected by the Court of Arbitration for Sport and he was stripped of the Olympic Bronze Medal. The medal was subsequently awarded to Croatia's Ivan Huklek.

Key:

- VT (ranking points: 5–0 or 0–5) – Victory by fall.
- VB (ranking points: 5–0 or 0–5) – Victory by injury (VF for forfeit, VA for withdrawal or disqualification)
- PP (ranking points: 3–1 or 1–3) – Decision by points – the loser with technical points.
- PO (ranking points: 3–0 or 0–3) – Decision by points – the loser without technical points.
- ST (ranking points: 4–0 or 0–4) – Great superiority – the loser without technical points and a margin of victory of at least 8 (Greco-Roman) or 10 (freestyle) points.
- SP (ranking points: 4–1 or 1–4) – Technical superiority – the loser with technical points and a margin of victory of at least 8 (Greco-Roman) or 10 (freestyle) points.

Greco-Roman

Athlete	Event	Round of 16	Quarterfinal	Semifinal	Repechage	Final / BM	
Athlete	Event	Opposition Result	Opposition Result	Opposition Result	Opposition Result	Opposition Result	Rank
Božo Starčević	Men's −77 kg	Mnatsakanian (BUL); W 3–1 ^{PP}	Geraei (IRI); L 1–3 ^{PP}	Did not advance			9
Ivan Huklek	Men's −87 kg	Stefanowicz (USA); W 3–1 ^{PP}	Assakalov (UZB); W 3–1 ^{PP}	Beleniuk (UKR); L 1–3 ^{PP}	Bye	Datunashvili (SRB); W DQ ^{PP}	3rd place, bronze medalist(s)
