= Greece at the 2020 Summer Olympics =

- IOC code: GRE
- NOC: Hellenic Olympic Committee
- Website: www.hoc.gr (in Greek and English)

in Tokyo, Japan July 23, 2021 – August 8, 2021
- Competitors: 83 (46 men and 37 women) in 17 sports
- Flag bearers (opening): Anna Korakaki; Eleftherios Petrounias
- Flag bearer (closing): Ioannis Fountoulis
- Medals Ranked 36th: Gold 2 Silver 1 Bronze 1 Total 4

Summer Olympics appearances (overview)
- 1896; 1900; 1904; 1908; 1912; 1920; 1924; 1928; 1932; 1936; 1948; 1952; 1956; 1960; 1964; 1968; 1972; 1976; 1980; 1984; 1988; 1992; 1996; 2000; 2004; 2008; 2012; 2016; 2020; 2024; 2028

Other related appearances
- 1906 Intercalated Games

Greece competed at the 2020 Summer Olympics in Tokyo. Originally scheduled to take place from 24 July to 9 August 2020, the Games were postponed to 23 July to 8 August 2021, because of the COVID-19 pandemic. Greek athletes have competed in every Summer Olympic Games of the modern era, alongside Australia, France, Great Britain, and Switzerland. As the progenitor nation of the Olympic Games and in keeping with tradition, Greece entered first at the New National Stadium during the parade of nations at the opening ceremony. Like the other closing ceremonies before, the Greek flag was also raised during the closing ceremony alongside the Japanese and French flags.

== Medalists ==
Medal	Name	Sport	Event	Date
Gold	Stefanos Ntouskos	Rowing	Men's single sculls	30 July
Gold	Miltiadis Tentoglou	Athletics	Men's long jump	2 August
Silver	Greece men's national water polo team: Stylianos Argyropoulos; Georgios Dervisis; Ioannis Fountoulis; Konstantinos Galanidis; Konstantinos Genidounias; Konstantinos Gkiouvetsis; Marios Kapotsis; Christodoulos Kolomvos; Konstantinos Mourikis; Alexandros Papanastasiou; Dimitrios Skoumpakis; Angelos Vlachopoulos; Emmanouil Zerdevas	Water polo	Men's tournament	8 August
Bronze	Eleftherios Petrounias	Gymnastics	Men's rings	2 August

Medals by gender
Gender	1st place, gold medalist(s)	2nd place, silver medalist(s)	3rd place, bronze medalist(s)	Total
Male	2	1	1	4
Female	0	0	0	0
Total	2	1	1	4

Medals by date
Day	Date	1st place, gold medalist(s)	2nd place, silver medalist(s)	3rd place, bronze medalist(s)	Total
Day 1	24 July	0	0	0	0
Day 2	25 July	0	0	0	0
Day 3	26 July	0	0	0	0
Day 4	27 July	0	0	0	0
Day 5	28 July	0	0	0	0
Day 6	29 July	0	0	0	0
Day 7	30 July	1	0	0	1
Day 8	31 July	0	0	0	0
Day 9	1 August	0	0	0	0
Day 10	2 August	1	0	1	2
Day 11	3 August	0	0	0	0
Day 12	4 August	0	0	0	0
Day 13	5 August	0	0	0	0
Day 14	6 August	0	0	0	0
Day 15	7 August	0	0	0	0
Day 16	8 August	0	1	0	1
Total		2	1	1	4

== Competitors ==
The following is the list of number of competitors in the Games.

Sport	Men	Women	Total
Archery	0	1	1
Artistic swimming	0	9	9
Athletics	8	12	20
Cycling	3	0	3
Fencing	0	1	1
Gymnastics	1	0	1
Judo	1	1	2
Rowing	1	3	4
Sailing	4	4	8
Shooting	1	1	2
Swimming	10	2	12
Table tennis	1	0	1
Taekwondo	0	1	1
Tennis	1	1	2
Water polo	13	0	13
Weightlifting	1	0	1
Wrestling	1	1	2
Total	46	37	83

== Archery ==
Greece has qualified one female archer, after Evangelia Psarra finished in the top 5 in the Final Qualification Tournament.

Athlete	Event	Ranking round		Round of 64	Round of 32	Round of 16	Quarterfinals	Semifinals	Final / BM	
Athlete	Event	Score	Seed	Opposition Score	Opposition Score	Opposition Score	Opposition Score	Opposition Score	Opposition Score	Rank
Evangelia Psarra	Women's individual	630	44	Lin C-e (TPE); L 4–6	did not advance					

== Artistic swimming ==
With a top 3 finish in the team event at FINA Artistic Swimming Olympic Games Qualification Tournament in Barcelona, Greece qualified for both events.

Athlete	Event	Technical routine		Free routine (preliminary)			Free routine (final)		
Athlete	Event	Points	Rank	Points	Total (technical + free)	Rank	Points	Total (technical + free)	Rank
Evangelia Papazoglou; Evangelia Platanioti	Duet	DNS – COVID-19		88.1667	—N/a	—	DNS – COVID-19		
Eleni Fragkaki; Krystalenia Gialama; Pinelopi Karamesiou; Maria Alzigkouzi Kominea; Andriana Misikevych; Evangelia Papazoglou; Evangelia Platanioti; Georgia Vasilopoulou; Danai Kariori (R)	Team	Withdrew ‌‌‌‌‌after testing positive for COVID-19							

== Athletics ==
Greek athletes further achieved the entry standards, either by qualifying time or by world ranking, in the following track and field events (up to a maximum of 3 athletes in each event):

Key

- Note–Ranks given for track events are within the athlete's heat only
- Q = Qualified for the next round
- q = Qualified for the next round as a fastest loser or, in field events, by position without achieving the qualifying target
- (i) = indoor
- N/A = Round not applicable for the event
- Bye = Athlete not required to compete in round

Track & road events
Men

Athlete	Event	Heat		Semifinal		Final	
Athlete	Event	Result	Rank	Result	Rank	Result	Rank
Konstantinos Douvalidis	110 m hurdles	13.63	27	Did not advance			
Alexandros Papamichail	50 km walk	—N/a				4:12:49	36

Women

Athlete	Event	Heat		Quarterfinal		Semifinal		Final	
Athlete	Event	Result	Rank	Result	Rank	Result	Rank	Result	Rank
Rafaéla Spanoudaki-Hatziriga	100 m	Bye		11.45	35	Did not advance			
Rafaéla Spanoudaki-Hatziriga	200 m	—N/a		23.16	22 q	23.38	23	Did not advance	
Irini Vasiliou	400 m	—N/a		53.16	35	Did not advance			
Elisavet Pesiridou	100 m hurdles	—N/a		DNF		Did not advance			
Antigoni Drisbioti	20 km walk	—N/a						1:31:24 SB	8
Kiriaki Filtisakou	20 km walk	—N/a						1:36:51	29
Panagiota Tsinopoulou	20 km walk	—N/a						1:47:19	53

Field events
Men

Athlete	Event	Qualification		Final	
Athlete	Event	Distance	Position	Distance	Position
Miltiadis Tentoglou	Long jump	8.22	2 Q	8.41 (Note: Tentoglou tied for silver with Cuba's Juan Miguel Echevarría, but was awarded with a gold on the tie-breaker (second best jump).)	1st place, gold medalist(s)
Dimitrios Tsiamis	Triple jump	NM	—	Did not advance	
Konstantinos Filippidis	Pole vault	5.50	22	Did not advance	
Emmanouil Karalis	Pole vault	5.75	8 q	5.80	=4
Mihail Anastasakis	Hammer throw	73.52	22	Did not advance	
Christos Frantzeskakis	Hammer throw	72.19	25	Did not advance	

Women

Athlete	Event	Qualification		Final	
Athlete	Event	Distance	Position	Distance	Position
Paraskevi Papachristou	Triple jump	12.23	32	Did not advance	
Nikoleta Kyriakopoulou	Pole vault	4.55	=1 q	4.55	=8
Eleni-Klaoudia Polak	Pole vault	4.40	19	Did not advance	
Katerina Stefanidi	Pole vault	4.55	=8 q	4.80 =SB	4
Chrysoula Anagnostopoulou	Discus throw	59.18	19	Did not advance	
Stamatia Scarvelis	Hammer throw	69.01	18	Did not advance	

== Cycling ==
=== Road ===
Greece entered one rider to compete in the men's Olympic road race, by virtue of his top 50 national finish (for men) in the UCI World Ranking.

Athlete	Event	Time	Rank
Polychronis Tzortzakis	Men's road race	6:16:53	63

=== Track ===
Following the completion of the 2020 UCI Track Cycling World Championships, Greece entered one rider to compete in the men's omnium based on his final individual UCI Olympic rankings.

Omnium

Athlete	Event	Scratch race		Tempo race		Elimination race		Points race		Total	
Athlete	Event	Rank	Points	Rank	Points	Rank	Points	Rank	Points	Points	Rank
Christos Volikakis	Men's omnium	17	8	17	8	14	14	DNF	−20	DNF	

=== Mountain bike ===
Greece qualified one mountain biker for the men's Olympic cross-country race, as a result of his nation's nineteenth-place finish in the UCI Olympic Ranking List of 16 May 2021.

Athlete	Event	Time	Rank
Periklis Ilias	Men's cross-country	LAP (3 laps)	35

== Fencing ==
Greece entered one fencer into the Olympic competition. 2019 world bronze medalist Theodora Gkountoura claimed a spot in the women's sabre as one of the two highest-ranked fencers vying for qualification from Europe in the FIE Adjusted Official Rankings.

Athlete	Event	Round of 64	Round of 32	Round of 16	Quarterfinal	Semifinal	Final / BM	
Athlete	Event	Opposition Score	Opposition Score	Opposition Score	Opposition Score	Opposition Score	Opposition Score	Rank
Theodora Gkountoura	Women's sabre	Bye	Emura (JPN); L 8–15	Did not advance				

== Gymnastics ==
=== Artistic ===
On 25 June 2021, Eleftherios Petrounias secured a position in men's rings at the 2020 Summer Olympics, by winning a gold medal with 15.500 points at the 2020–2021 FIG World Cup in Doha, Qatar.

Men

Athlete	Event	Qualification								Final							
Athlete	Event	Apparatus						Total	Rank	Apparatus						Total	Rank
Athlete	Event	F	PH	R	V	PB	HB	Total	Rank	F	PH	R	V	PB	HB	Total	Rank
Eleftherios Petrounias	Rings	—N/a		15.333	—N/a			15.333	1 Q	—N/a			15.200	—N/a		15.200	3rd place, bronze medalist(s)

== Judo ==
Alexios Ntanatsidis secured a position in his category by virtue of his world ranking. Elisavet Teltsidou secured a position in her category through a continental quota.

Athlete	Event	Round of 64	Round of 32	Round of 16	Quarterfinals	Semifinals	Repechage	Final / BM	
Athlete	Event	Opposition Result	Opposition Result	Opposition Result	Opposition Result	Opposition Result	Opposition Result	Opposition Result	Rank
Alexios Ntanatsidis	Men's −81 kg	Bye	Valois-Fortier (CAN); L 00–10 GS	Did not advance					
Elisavet Teltsidou	Women's −70 kg	—N/a	Sun Xq (CHN); W 01–00	Pinot (FRA); W 10–00	Taimazova (ROC); L 00–01	Did not advance	Scoccimarro (GER); L 00–10 GS	Did not advance	7

== Rowing ==
Greece qualified three boats for each of the following rowing classes into the Olympic regatta. The women's coxless pair confirmed an Olympic place by finishing fifth in the B-final and secured the last of eleven berths available at the 2019 FISA World Championships in Ottensheim, Austria, while the men's single sculls rower added one boat for the Greek roster with a top finish at the 2021 European Continental Qualification Regatta in Varese, Italy. Another Greek rower scored a gold-medal triumph to book one of the remaining boats available in the women's single sculls at the 2021 FISA Final Qualification Regatta in Lucerne, Switzerland.

Athlete	Event	Heat		Repechage		Quarterfinal		Semifinal		Final	
Athlete	Event	Time	Rank	Time	Rank	Time	Rank	Time	Rank	Time	Rank
Stefanos Ntouskos	Men's single sculls	6:59.49	1 QF	Bye		7:12.77	2 SA/B	6:41.61	1 FA	6:40.45 OR	1st place, gold medalist(s)
Anneta Kyridou	Women's single sculls	7:54.28	3 QF	Bye		8:02.19	3 SA/B	7:40.81	6 FB	7:36.79	10
Christina Bourmpou; Maria Kyridou	Women's pair	7:33.94	5 R	7:28.00	1 SA/B	—N/a		6:48.70 WR	1 FA	6:57.11	5

Qualification Legend: FA=Final A (medal); FB=Final B (non-medal); FC=Final C (non-medal); FD=Final D (non-medal); FE=Final E (non-medal); FF=Final F (non-medal); SA/B=Semifinals A/B; SC/D=Semifinals C/D; SE/F=Semifinals E/F; QF=Quarterfinals; R=Repechage

== Sailing ==
Greek sailors qualified one boat in each of the following classes through the 2018 Sailing World Championships, the class-associated Worlds, and the continental regattas.

Men

Athlete	Event	Race													Net points	Final rank
Athlete	Event	1	2	3	4	5	6	7	8	9	10	11	12	M*	Net points	Final rank
Byron Kokkalanis	RS:X	8	17	10	5	~~DNF~~	8	18	19	6	7	8	4	EL	110	11
Ioannis Mitakis	Finn	4	13	13	6	11	10	11	8	16	~~18~~	—N/a		EL	92	12
Pavlos Kagialis; Panagiotis Mantis	470	5	6	3	~~DSQ~~	15	12	8	7	4	6	—N/a		9	84	8

Women

Athlete	Event	Race													Net points	Final rank
Athlete	Event	1	2	3	4	5	6	7	8	9	10	11	12	M*	Net points	Final rank
Aikaterini Divari	RS:X	19	19	19	20	20	~~23~~	15	18	13	19	19	23	EL	204	19
Vasileia Karachaliou	Laser Radial	2	19	6	1	21	21	9	~~26~~	19	8	—N/a		6	112	9
Ariadne Paraskevi Spanaki; Emilia Tsoulfa	470	14	8	~~BFD~~	17	18	13	2	12	UFD	9	—N/a		EL	114	15

M = Medal race, EL = Eliminated – did not advance into the medal race, DNF= Did not finish the race, BFD = Black Flag Disqualification – False start, DSQ = Disqualification, UFD = "U" Flag Disqualification

== Shooting ==
Greek shooters achieved quota places for the following events by virtue of their best finishes at the 2018 ISSF World Championships, the 2019 ISSF World Cup series, European Championships or Games, and European Qualifying Tournament, as long as they obtained a minimum qualifying score (MQS) by May 31, 2020.

Athlete	Event	Qualification		Final	
Athlete	Event	Points	Rank	Points	Rank
Nikolaos Mavrommatis	Men's skeet	119	20	Did not advance	
Anna Korakaki	Women's 10 m air pistol	585	2 Q	157.4	6
Anna Korakaki	Women's 25 m pistol	584	6 Q	18	6

== Swimming ==
Greek swimmers further achieved qualifying standards in the following events (up to a maximum of 2 swimmers in each event at the Olympic Qualifying Time (OQT), and potentially 1 at the Olympic Selection Time (OST)):

Men

Athlete	Event	Heat		Semifinal		Final	
Athlete	Event	Time	Rank	Time	Rank	Time	Rank
Apostolos Christou	100 m backstroke	53.77	=15 Q	53.41	11	Did not advance	
Apostolos Christou	100 m freestyle	48.50	18	Did not advance			
Konstantinos Englezakis	800 m freestyle	DNS		—N/a		Did not advance	
Kristian Gkolomeev	50 m freestyle	21.66	3 Q	21.60	=3 Q	21.72	=5
Athanasios Kynigakis	10 km open water	—N/a				1:49:29.2	5
Dimitrios Markos	200 m freestyle	1:49.16	31	Did not advance			
Dimitrios Markos	800 m freestyle	7:58.68	26	—N/a		did not advance	
Apostolos Papastamos	200 m individual medley	2:00.38	35	Did not advance			
Apostolos Papastamos	400 m individual medley	4:12.50	14	—N/a		Did not advance	
Andreas Vazaios	200 m individual medley	1:58.84	24	Did not advance			
Apostolos Christou; Kristian Gkolomeev; Odysseas Meladinis; Andreas Vazaios	4 × 100 m freestyle relay	3:15.29	15	—N/a		Did not advance	
Apostolos Christou; Evangelos Makrygiannis; Konstantinos Meretsolias; Andreas Vazaios	4 × 100 m medley relay	3:36.28	14	—N/a		Did not advance	

Women

Athlete	Event	Heat		Semifinal		Final	
Athlete	Event	Time	Rank	Time	Rank	Time	Rank
Anna Ntountounaki	100 m butterfly	57.75	13 Q	57.25 NR	9	Did not advance	

Mixed

Athlete	Event	Heat		Final	
Athlete	Event	Time	Rank	Time	Rank
Apostolos Christou; Theodora Drakou; Konstantinos Meretsolias; Anna Ntountounaki	4 × 100 m medley relay	3:44.77 NR	11	Did not advance	

== Table tennis ==
Greece entered one athlete into the table tennis competition at the Games. Panagiotis Gionis scored a third-stage semifinal triumph to book his fifth consecutive trip to the Games in the men's singles at the European Qualification Tournament in Odivelas, Portugal.

Athlete	Event	Preliminary	Round 1	Round 2	Round 3	Round of 16	Quarterfinals	Semifinals	Final / BM	
Athlete	Event	Opposition Result	Opposition Result	Opposition Result	Opposition Result	Opposition Result	Opposition Result	Opposition Result	Opposition Result	Rank
Panagiotis Gionis	Men's singles	Bye	Peto (SRB); W 4–0	Saleh (EGY); W 4–1	Jeoung Y-s (KOR); L 3–4	Did not advance				

== Taekwondo ==
Greece entered one athlete into the taekwondo competition at the Games for the first time since 2012. 2018 Youth Olympic bronze medalist Fani Tzeli secured a spot in the women's lightweight category (57 kg) with a top two finish at the 2021 European Qualification Tournament in Sofia, Bulgaria.

Athlete	Event	Qualification	Round of 16	Quarterfinals	Semifinals	Repechage	Final / BM	
Athlete	Event	Opposition Result	Opposition Result	Opposition Result	Opposition Result	Opposition Result	Opposition Result	Rank
Fani Tzeli	Women's −57 kg	Bye	Minina (ROC); L 7–15	Did not advance		Ben Yessouf (NIG); L 0–2 GP	Did not advance	7

== Tennis ==
Stefanos Tsitsipas and Maria Sakkari secured a position in the Men's and Women's singles respectively by virtue of their world rankings on 14 June 2021. In addition, their combined ranking made them available to play together in the Mixed doubles tournament.

Athlete	Event	Round of 64	Round of 32	Round of 16	Quarterfinals	Semifinals	Final / BM	
Athlete	Event	Opposition Score	Opposition Score	Opposition Score	Opposition Score	Opposition Score	Opposition Score	Rank
Stefanos Tsitsipas	Men's singles	Kohlschreiber (GER); W 6–3, 3–6, 6–3	Tiafoe (USA); W 6–3, 6–4	Humbert (FRA); L 6–2, 6–7^{(4–7)}, 2–6	Did not advance			
Maria Sakkari	Women's singles	Kontaveit (EST); W 7–5, 6–2	Stojanović (SRB); W 6–1, 6–2	Svitolina (UKR); L 7–5, 3–6, 4–6	Did not advance			
Maria Sakkari; Stefanos Tsitsipas	Mixed doubles	—N/a		Dabrowski / Auger-Aliassime (CAN); W 6–3, 6–4	Barty / Peers (AUS); L 4–6, 6–4, [6–10]	Did not advance		

== Water polo ==
Summary

Key:
- FT – After full time.
- P – Match decided by penalty-shootout.

Team	Event	Group stage						Quarterfinal	Semifinal	Final / BM	
Team	Event	Opposition Score	Opposition Score	Opposition Score	Opposition Score	Opposition Score	Rank	Opposition Score	Opposition Score	Opposition Score	Rank
Greece men's	Men's tournament	Hungary; W 10–9	Italy; D 6–6	Japan; W 10–9	South Africa; W 28–5	United States; W 14–5	1 Q	Montenegro; W 10–4	Hungary; W 9–6	Serbia; L 10–13	2nd place, silver medalist(s)

=== Men's tournament ===
Greece men's national water polo team qualified for the Olympics by advancing to the final match of the 2020 World Qualification Tournament in Rotterdam, Netherlands.

Team roster

Greece's final squad was announced on 3 July 2021.

Head coach: Thodoris Vlachos

No.	Player	Pos.	L/R	Height	Weight	Date of birth (age)	Apps	OG/ Goals	Club	Ref
1	Emmanouil Zerdevas	GK	R	1.85 m (6 ft 1 in)	89 kg (196 lb)	12 August 1997 (aged 23)	84	0/0	(Greece) Olympiacos	
2	Konstantinos Genidounias	D	R	1.83 m (6 ft 0 in)	92 kg (203 lb)	3 May 1993 (aged 28)	161	1/4	(Greece) Olympiacos	
3	Dimitrios Skoumpakis	CB	R	2.03 m (6 ft 8 in)	109 kg (240 lb)	18 December 1998 (aged 22)	70	0/0	(Greece) Olympiacos	
4	Marios Kapotsis	D	R	1.83 m (6 ft 0 in)	84 kg (185 lb)	13 September 1991 (aged 29)	108	0/0	(Greece) Olympiacos	
5	Ioannis Fountoulis (C)	D	R	1.85 m (6 ft 1 in)	89 kg (196 lb)	25 May 1988 (aged 33)	311	2/24	(Greece) Olympiacos	
6	Alexandros Papanastasiou	D	R	1.94 m (6 ft 4 in)	86 kg (190 lb)	12 February 1999 (aged 22)	58	0/0	(Croatia) Jug Dubrovnik	
7	Georgios Dervisis	CB	R	1.95 m (6 ft 5 in)	100 kg (220 lb)	30 October 1994 (aged 26)	146	1/3	(Greece) Olympiacos	
8	Stylianos Argyropoulos	CB	R	1.90 m (6 ft 3 in)	100 kg (220 lb)	2 August 1996 (aged 24)	97	0/0	(Greece) Olympiacos	
9	Konstantinos Mourikis	CF	R	1.98 m (6 ft 6 in)	115 kg (254 lb)	11 July 1988 (aged 33)	272	2/11	(Greece) Olympiacos	
10	Christodoulos Kolomvos	CF	R	1.86 m (6 ft 1 in)	106 kg (234 lb)	26 October 1988 (aged 32)	239	1/2	(Turkey) Enka	
11	Konstantinos Gkiouvetsis	D	R	1.91 m (6 ft 3 in)	94 kg (207 lb)	19 November 1999 (aged 21)	28	0/0	(Greece) Vouliagmeni	
12	Angelos Vlachopoulos	D	R	1.80 m (5 ft 11 in)	80 kg (176 lb)	28 September 1991 (aged 29)	183	1/13	(Serbia) Novi Beograd	
13	Konstantinos Galanidis	GK	R	2.02 m (6 ft 8 in)	110 kg (243 lb)	1 September 1990 (aged 30)	103	0/0	(Greece) Apollon Smyrnis	
Average				1.90 m (6 ft 3 in)	96 kg (212 lb)	27 years, 255 days	143			

Note: Age as of 23 July 2021
Source: Greece Men | Tokyo 2020 Olympics Archived 2021-07-22 at the Wayback Machine

Group play

Pos	Team	Pld	W	D	L	GF	GA	GD	Pts	Qualification
1	Greece	5	4	1	0	68	34	+34	9	Quarterfinals
2	Italy	5	3	2	0	60	32	+28	8	Quarterfinals
3	Hungary	5	3	1	1	64	35	+29	7	Quarterfinals
4	United States	5	2	0	3	59	53	+6	4	Quarterfinals
5	Japan (H)	5	1	0	4	65	66	−1	2	
6	South Africa	5	0	0	5	20	116	−96	0	

Source: Tokyo 2020 and FINA
Rules for classification: 1) Points; 2) Head-to-head points; 3) Head-to-head goal difference; 4) Head-to-head goals scored; 5) Goal difference.
(H) Hosts

25 July 2021; 11:30 v	Report	Hungary	9–10	Greece	Tokyo Tatsumi International Swimming Center; Referees: Michiel Zwart (NED), Vojin Putniković (SRB)
25 July 2021; 11:30 v	Report	Score by quarters: 3–2, 3–4, 2–3, 1–1			Tokyo Tatsumi International Swimming Center; Referees: Michiel Zwart (NED), Vojin Putniković (SRB)
25 July 2021; 11:30 v	Report	Erdélyi, Varga 3	Goals	Fountoulis 3	Tokyo Tatsumi International Swimming Center; Referees: Michiel Zwart (NED), Vojin Putniković (SRB)

27 July 2021; 15:30 v	Report	Italy	6–6	Greece	Tokyo Tatsumi International Swimming Center; Referees: Xevi Buch (ESP), Stanko Ivanovski (MNE)
27 July 2021; 15:30 v	Report	Score by quarters: 1–1, 1–1, 0–4, 4–0			Tokyo Tatsumi International Swimming Center; Referees: Xevi Buch (ESP), Stanko Ivanovski (MNE)
27 July 2021; 15:30 v	Report	Aicardi, Figlioli 2	Goals	six players 1	Tokyo Tatsumi International Swimming Center; Referees: Xevi Buch (ESP), Stanko Ivanovski (MNE)

29 July 2021; 18:20 v	Report	Greece	10–9	Japan	Tokyo Tatsumi International Swimming Center; Referees: Adrian Alexandrescu (ROU), Vojin Putniković (SRB)
29 July 2021; 18:20 v	Report	Score by quarters: 1–1, 4–4, 2–1, 3–3			Tokyo Tatsumi International Swimming Center; Referees: Adrian Alexandrescu (ROU), Vojin Putniković (SRB)
29 July 2021; 18:20 v	Report	Kapotsis, Genidounias 3	Goals	Adachi 3	Tokyo Tatsumi International Swimming Center; Referees: Adrian Alexandrescu (ROU), Vojin Putniković (SRB)

31 July 2021; 19:50 v	Report	South Africa	5–28	Greece	Tokyo Tatsumi International Swimming Center; Referees: John Waldow (NZL), Zhang Liang (CHN)
31 July 2021; 19:50 v	Report	Score by quarters: 1–7, 2–5, 1–7, 1–9			Tokyo Tatsumi International Swimming Center; Referees: John Waldow (NZL), Zhang Liang (CHN)
31 July 2021; 19:50 v	Report	Stone 2	Goals	Fountoulis 5	Tokyo Tatsumi International Swimming Center; Referees: John Waldow (NZL), Zhang Liang (CHN)

2 August 2021; 11:30 v	Report	Greece	14–5	United States	Tokyo Tatsumi International Swimming Center; Referees: Adrian Alexandrescu (ROU), Michiel Zwart (NED)
2 August 2021; 11:30 v	Report	Score by quarters: 4–1, 2–2, 5–2, 3–0			Tokyo Tatsumi International Swimming Center; Referees: Adrian Alexandrescu (ROU), Michiel Zwart (NED)
2 August 2021; 11:30 v	Report	Genidounias 5	Goals	Obert 2	Tokyo Tatsumi International Swimming Center; Referees: Adrian Alexandrescu (ROU), Michiel Zwart (NED)

Quarterfinal

4 August 2021; 15:30 v	Report	Greece	10–4	Montenegro	Tokyo Tatsumi International Swimming Center; Referees: Adrian Alexandrescu (ROU), Alessandro Severo (ITA)
4 August 2021; 15:30 v	Report	Score by quarters: 1–0, 2–1, 3–1, 4–2			Tokyo Tatsumi International Swimming Center; Referees: Adrian Alexandrescu (ROU), Alessandro Severo (ITA)
4 August 2021; 15:30 v	Report	Genidounias 5	Goals	Ivović 2	Tokyo Tatsumi International Swimming Center; Referees: Adrian Alexandrescu (ROU), Alessandro Severo (ITA)

Semifinal

6 August 2021; 15:30 v	Report	Greece	9–6	Hungary	Tokyo Tatsumi International Swimming Center; Referees: Michael Goldenberg (USA), Arkadiy Voevodin (RUS)
6 August 2021; 15:30 v	Report	Score by quarters: 2–1, 1–1, 2–2, 4–2			Tokyo Tatsumi International Swimming Center; Referees: Michael Goldenberg (USA), Arkadiy Voevodin (RUS)
6 August 2021; 15:30 v	Report	Argyropoulos 4	Goals	Manhercz 2	Tokyo Tatsumi International Swimming Center; Referees: Michael Goldenberg (USA), Arkadiy Voevodin (RUS)

Gold medal game

8 August 2021; 16:30 v	Report	Greece	10–13	Serbia	Tokyo Tatsumi International Swimming Center; Referees: Michael Goldenberg (USA), Xevi Buch (ESP)
8 August 2021; 16:30 v	Report	Score by quarters: 3–6, 4–2, 2–2, 1–3			Tokyo Tatsumi International Swimming Center; Referees: Michael Goldenberg (USA), Xevi Buch (ESP)
8 August 2021; 16:30 v	Report	three players 2	Goals	three players 3	Tokyo Tatsumi International Swimming Center; Referees: Michael Goldenberg (USA), Xevi Buch (ESP)

== Weightlifting ==
Greece has received a letter from IWF to fill a vacancy sending a male weightlifter to the Olympics.

Athlete	Event	Snatch		Clean & Jerk		Total	Rank
Athlete	Event	Result	Rank	Result	Rank	Total	Rank
Theodoros Iakovidis	Men's −96 kg	156	12	182	11	338	11

== Wrestling ==
Greece qualified two wrestlers for each of the following classes into the Olympic competition. One of them finished among the top six to claim an Olympic slot in the women's freestyle 53 kg at the 2019 World Championships, while an additional license was awarded to the Greek wrestler, who progressed to the top two finals of the men's freestyle 65 kg at the 2021 World Qualification Tournament in Sofia, Bulgaria.

Key:

- VT (ranking points: 5–0 or 0–5) – Victory by fall.
- VB (ranking points: 5–0 or 0–5) – Victory by injury (VF for forfeit, VA for withdrawal or disqualification)
- PP (ranking points: 3–1 or 1–3) – Decision by points – the loser with technical points.
- PO (ranking points: 3–0 or 0–3) – Decision by points – the loser without technical points.
- ST (ranking points: 4–0 or 0–4) – Great superiority – the loser without technical points and a margin of victory of at least 8 (Greco-Roman) or 10 (freestyle) points.
- SP (ranking points: 4–1 or 1–4) – Technical superiority – the loser with technical points and a margin of victory of at least 8 (Greco-Roman) or 10 (freestyle) points.

Freestyle

Athlete	Event	Round of 16	Quarterfinals	Semifinals	Repechage	Final / BM	
Athlete	Event	Opposition Result	Opposition Result	Opposition Result	Opposition Result	Opposition Result	Rank
Georgios Pilidis	Men's −65 kg	Gadzhiev (POL); L 0–4 ^{ST}	Did not advance				15
Maria Prevolaraki	Women's −53 kg	Valverde (ECU); L 1–3 ^{PP}	Did not advance				11
