= Tennis at the 2020 Summer Olympics – Mixed doubles =

Mixed doubles
- Tennis at the 2020 Summer Olympics

Final
- Champions: Anastasia Pavlyuchenkova (ROC); Andrey Rublev (ROC)
- Runners-up: Elena Vesnina (ROC); Aslan Karatsev (ROC)
- Score: 6–3, 6–7^{(5–7)}, [13–11]

Events
Singles	men	women
Doubles	men	women	mixed
Qualification
- Summer Olympics

Mixed doubles at the Games of the XXXII Olympiad
- Venue: Ariake Coliseum
- Dates: 28 July – 1 August 2021
- Competitors: 32 from 14 nations
- Teams: 16

Medalists
1st place, gold medalist(s)		ROC: Anastasia Pavlyuchenkova; Andrey Rublev
2nd place, silver medalist(s)		ROC: Elena Vesnina; Aslan Karatsev
3rd place, bronze medalist(s)		Australia: Ashleigh Barty; John Peers

Anastasia Pavlyuchenkova and Andrey Rublev of the Russian Olympic Committee defeated compatriots Elena Vesnina and Aslan Karatsev in the final, 6–3, 6–7^{(5–7)}, [13–11] to win the gold medal in mixed doubles tennis at the 2020 Summer Olympics. Australia's Ashleigh Barty and John Peers won the bronze medal following a withdrawal from Serbia's Nina Stojanović and Novak Djokovic. 32 competitors (16 pairs) from 14 countries participated.

Elena Vesnina with her mixed doubles silver olympic medal

== Background ==
This was the 7th (medal) appearance of the mixed doubles tennis event. The event was first held in 1900 and would not be held again until 1912 (when both outdoor and indoor versions were held); it would then be held the next two Games in 1920 and 1924. Tennis was not a medal sport from 1928 to 1984, though there were demonstration events in 1968 (which included mixed doubles) and 1984 (which did not). Mixed doubles did not return with the rest of the tennis programme in 1988; instead, it was not until 2012 that mixed doubles returned to the programme, where it has been since.

Bethanie Mattek-Sands and Jack Sock won the title in 2016, but Sock did not qualify for the Olympic Games in Tokyo. Mattek-Sands participated with Rajeev Ram, but they lost in the first round to Laura Siegemund and Kevin Krawietz.

Canada, Croatia, Japan, and Kazakhstan made their mixed doubles debut; Russian athletes competed under the ROC name and flag due to World Anti-Doping Agency sanctions. France competed for the sixth time, the most among all nations.

== Qualification ==
Each National Olympic Committee (NOC) can enter up to two pairs (four players). There are 16 pairs places (32 players) in the event. Qualification is based primarily on the ranking lists of 14 June 2021. Mixed Doubles teams will be selected from athletes that have been accepted for the singles and/or the doubles events. 15 places are allocated to the highest ranked teams based on the combined ranking of each team. One place goes to the highest ranked nominated team from the host nation.

The entries for the competition must be made on-site by 11:00 local time on 27 July.

== Competition format ==
The competition was a single-elimination tournament with a bronze-medal match. Matches were best-of-3 sets, except that the third set was a match tiebreak (first to 10 points) instead of a typical set. A tiebreak was played if one of the first two sets reached 6–6.

== Schedule ==
The competition was held over five days from 28 July to 1 August 2021. Times given are the start of tennis sessions, though the mixed doubles shared courts with other tennis events.

July				August
28	29	30	31	1
11:00	15:00	15:00	15:00	15:00
Round of 16	Quarter-finals	Semi-finals	Bronze medal match	Gold medal match

All times are Japan Standard Time (UTC+9)

== Seeds ==
1. Kristina Mladenovic (FRA) / Nicolas Mahut (FRA) (first round)
2. Maria Sakkari (GRE) / Stefanos Tsitsipas (GRE) (quarterfinals)
3. Bethanie Mattek-Sands (USA) / Rajeev Ram (USA) (first round)
4. Anastasia Pavlyuchenkova (ROC) / Andrey Rublev (ROC) (champions, gold medalists)

== Draw ==
Key

- Q = Qualifier
- WC = Wild card
- LL = Lucky loser
- Alt = Alternate
- ITF = ITF entry
- PR = Protected ranking
- SR = Special ranking
- SE = Special exempt
- JE = Junior exempt
- JR = Junior Accelerator Programme entrant
- CO = College Accelerator Programme entrant
- NG = Next Gen Accelerator Program entrant
- w/o = Walkover
- r = Retired
- d = Defaulted

=== Bracket ===
Round of 16
1	K Mladenovic (FRA); N Mahut (FRA)	4	2
PR	E Vesnina (ROC); A Karatsev (ROC)	6	6
Alt	F Ferro (FRA); P-H Herbert (FRA)	3	6^{3}
I Świątek (POL); Ł Kubot (POL)	6	7^{7}
3	B Mattek-Sands (USA); R Ram (USA)	4	7	[8]
L Siegemund (GER); K Krawietz (GER)	6	5	[10]
N Stojanović (SRB); N Djokovic (SRB)	6	6
L Stefani (BRA); M Melo (BRA)	3	4
PR	Y Shvedova (KAZ); A Golubev (KAZ)	3	6^{3}
ITF	E Shibahara (JPN); B McLachlan (JPN)	6	7^{7}
D Jurak (CRO); I Dodig (CRO)	7	4	[9]
4	A Pavlyuchenkova (ROC); A Rublev (ROC)	5	6	[11]
A Barty (AUS); J Peers (AUS)	6	7^{7}
N Podoroska (ARG); H Zeballos (ARG)	1	6^{3}
G Dabrowski (CAN); F Auger-Aliassime (CAN)	3	4
2	M Sakkari (GRE); S Tsitsipas (GRE)	6	6

Quarterfinals
PR	E Vesnina (ROC); A Karatsev (ROC)	6	6
I Świątek (POL); Ł Kubot (POL)	4	4
L Siegemund (GER); K Krawietz (GER)	1	2
N Stojanović (SRB); N Djokovic (SRB)	6	6
ITF	E Shibahara (JPN); B McLachlan (JPN)	5	7^{7}	[8]
4	A Pavlyuchenkova (ROC); A Rublev (ROC)	7	6^{0}	[10]
A Barty (AUS); J Peers (AUS)	6	4	[10]
2	M Sakkari (GRE); S Tsitsipas (GRE)	4	6	[6]

Semifinals
PR	E Vesnina (ROC); A Karatsev (ROC)	7^{7}	7
N Stojanović (SRB); N Djokovic (SRB)	6^{4}	5
4	A Pavlyuchenkova (ROC); A Rublev (ROC)	5	6	[13]
A Barty (AUS); J Peers (AUS)	7	4	[11]

Final (gold medal)
PR	E Vesnina (ROC); A Karatsev (ROC)	3	7^{7}	[11]
4	A Pavlyuchenkova (ROC); A Rublev (ROC)	6	6^{5}	[13]
Bronze medal
N Stojanović (SRB); N Djokovic (SRB)
A Barty (AUS); J Peers (AUS)	w/o
