= Tennis at the 2020 Summer Olympics – Women's singles =

Women's singles
- Tennis at the 2020 Summer Olympics

Final
- Champion: (Switzerland) Belinda Bencic
- Runner-up: (Czech Republic) Markéta Vondroušová
- Score: 7–5, 2–6, 6–3

Events
Singles	men	women
Doubles	men	women	mixed
Qualification
- Summer Olympics

Women's singles at the Games of the XXXII Olympiad
- Olympic tennis pictogram
- Venue: Ariake Coliseum
- Dates: 24–31 July 2021
- Competitors: 64 from 35 nations

Medalists
1st place, gold medalist(s)		Belinda Bencic; Switzerland
2nd place, silver medalist(s)		Markéta Vondroušová; Czech Republic
3rd place, bronze medalist(s)		Elina Svitolina; Ukraine

Switzerland's Belinda Bencic defeated the Czech Republic's Markéta Vondroušová in the final, 7–5, 2–6, 6–3, to win the gold medal in women's singles tennis at the 2020 Summer Olympics. It was Switzerland's first victory in the women's singles. In the bronze medal match, Ukraine's Elina Svitolina defeated Kazakhstan's Elena Rybakina, 1–6, 7–6^{(7–5)}, 6–4. It was Ukraine's first Olympic tennis medal.

The tournament was held at the Ariake Coliseum in Kōtō, Tokyo, Japan from 24 to 31 July 2021. There were 64 competitors from 35 countries.

Puerto Rico's Monica Puig was the reigning gold medalist in 2016, but she withdrew in order to recover from shoulder surgery. The 2016 silver medalist, Germany's Angelique Kerber, also withdrew prior to the tournament for rest. The Czech Republic's Petra Kvitová was the defending bronze medalist and attended her third consecutive Olympic Games, but was defeated in the second round by Belgium's Alison Van Uytvanck.

The medals for the competition were presented by Camilo Perez, IOC Member; Paraguay; and the medalists' bouquets were presented by Kelly Fairweather, ITF Secretary General; South Africa.

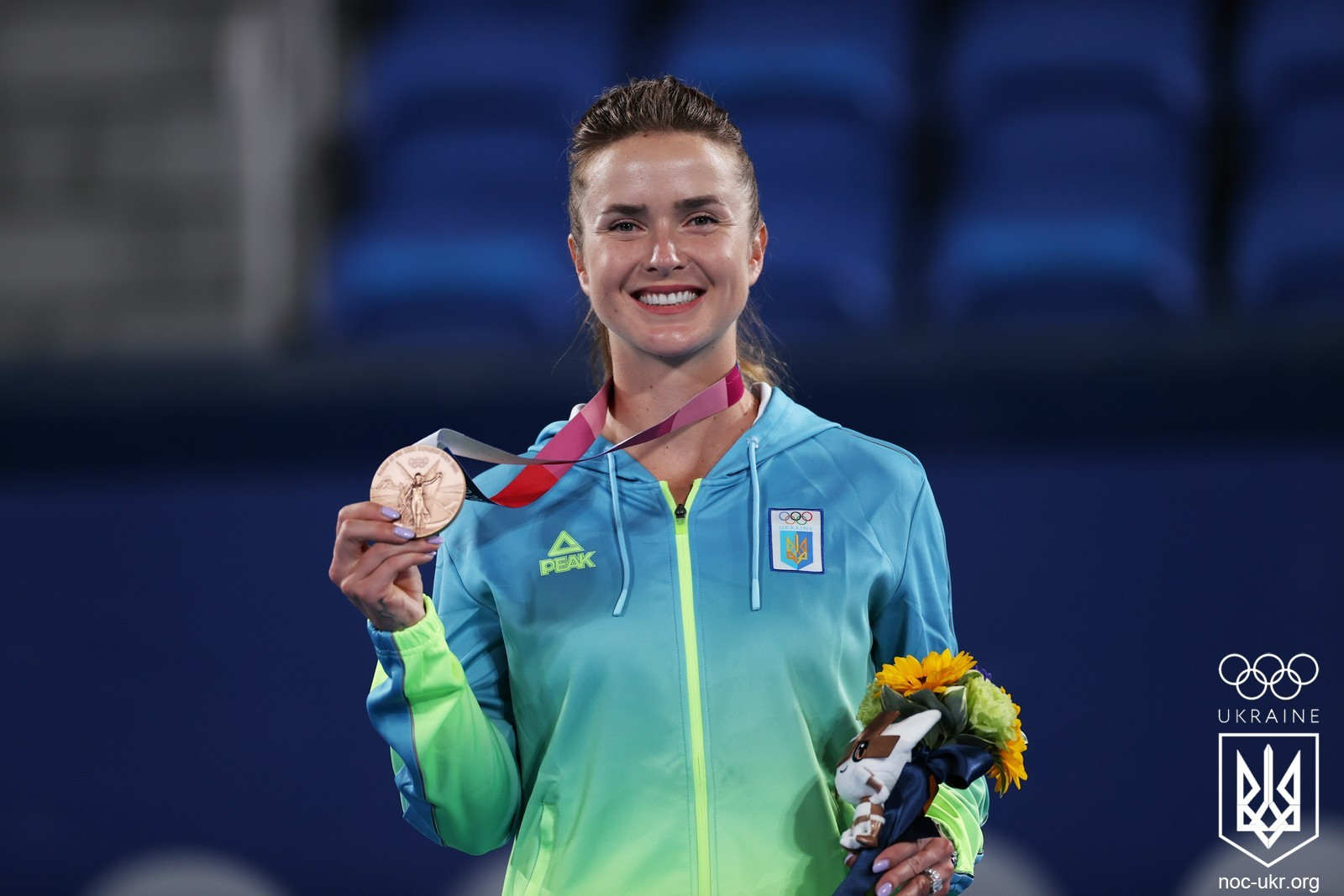
Ukraine Elina Svitolina with her bronze Olympic medal

== Background ==
This was the 14th appearance of the women's singles tennis. A women's event was held only once during the first three Games (only men's tennis was played in 1896 and 1904), but has been held at every Olympics for which there was a tennis tournament since 1908. Tennis was not a medal sport from 1928 to 1984, though there were demonstration events in 1968 and 1984.

This was the first Olympic tournament since 1996 not to feature the Williams sisters in the draw after Serena withdrew for family commitments and Venus's ranking had not been high enough to qualify for the team. Of the top players in the annual race to the year-end WTA Finals, the top nine appeared at the tournament, with 15 of the top 20 ranked players overall attending the Olympics. Among the top players to withdraw prior to the Games were Sofia Kenin, Serena Williams, Bianca Andreescu, Simona Halep, Victoria Azarenka, and Coco Gauff.

This was the final career singles tournament of former world No. 4 and French Open semifinalist Kiki Bertens, who had announced her retirement from the sport at the conclusion of this tournament. She lost to Vondroušová in the first round; her final career match was in the second round of the doubles tournament, where she and Demi Schuurs lost to Veronika Kudermetova and Elena Vesnina.

Egypt saw a player qualify in women's singles for the first time in Mayar Sherif. France made its 13th appearance, the most among nations, having missed only the 1908 Games in London, when only British players competed.

== Qualification ==
Each National Olympic Committee (NOC) can enter up to four players. Nations had been limited to four players in the event since the 2000 Games. Qualification for the women's singles is primarily through the WTA ranking list of 14 June 2021. An additional restriction is that players had to have been part of a nominated team for three Billie Jean King Cup events between 2017 and 2020 (with some exceptions). There are 64 quota places available for women's singles.

The first 56 are assigned through the world ranking.

There are six places available through continental qualification: four through continental tournaments (two in the 2019 Pan American Games, one in the 2018 Asian Games, and one in the 2019 African Games) and two through continent-restricted world ranking (one each for Europe and Oceania, which must come from NOCs with no other qualified competitors). The four continental tournament places take precedence over the world ranking, so the winners (Nadia Podoroska, Verónica Cepede Royg, Mayar Sherif, and Wang Qiang) are not counted toward the 56 (but are counted toward the four-per-nation limit). One place was guaranteed to the host nation Japan.

In an unusual career accomplishment qualification process, one spot is reserved for a former Olympic or Grand Slam champion who has not qualified through the current world rankings. The player must have won an Olympic gold medal or a Grand Slam singles final, be within the top 300 ranked players, and be from a nation that has not already qualified four players. If multiple players meet those criteria, the one with the most titles qualifies; if still tied, the highest ranked player qualifies. If no players meet those criteria, an additional place (57th or 58th) is added to the ranking. For the 2020 tournament, the 'career wild card' quota was taken by 2011 US Open singles champion Samantha Stosur (Venus Williams was not eligible due to the United States already having four players and defending champion Monica Puig was expecting to be in the entry list but withdrew due to injury).

== Competition format ==
The competition was a single-elimination tournament with a bronze medal match. Matches were best-of-3 sets. A tiebreak is played in all sets reaching 6–6, including the last set of a match.

== Schedule ==
The competition is held over eight days from 24 July to 31 July. Times given are the start of tennis sessions, though the women's singles share courts with other tennis events.

July
24	25	26	27	28	29	30	31
11:00	11:00	11:00	11:00	11:00	15:00		15:00
Round of 64		Round of 32	Round of 16	Quarter-finals	Semi-finals		Bronze medal match
Round of 64		Round of 32	Round of 16	Quarter-finals	Semi-finals		Gold medal match

All times are Japan Standard Time (UTC+9)

== Seeds ==
1. Ashleigh Barty (AUS) (first round)
2. Naomi Osaka (JPN) (third round)
3. Aryna Sabalenka (BLR) (second round)
4. Elina Svitolina (UKR) (semifinals, bronze medalist)
5. Karolína Plíšková (CZE) (third round)
6. Iga Świątek (POL) (second round)
7. Garbiñe Muguruza (ESP) (quarterfinals)
8. Barbora Krejčíková (CZE) (third round)
9. Belinda Bencic (SUI) (champion, gold medalist)
10. Petra Kvitová (CZE) (second round)
11. Jennifer Brady (USA) (first round)
12. Elise Mertens (BEL) (first round)
13. Anastasia Pavlyuchenkova (ROC) (quarterfinals)
14. Maria Sakkari (GRE) (third round)
15. Elena Rybakina (KAZ) (semifinals, fourth place)
16. Kiki Bertens (NED) (first round)

Click on the seed number of a player to go to their draw section.

== Draw ==
Key

- Q = Qualifier
- WC = Wild card
- LL = Lucky loser
- Alt = Alternate
- ITF = ITF entry
- PR = Protected ranking
- SR = Special ranking
- SE = Special exempt
- JE = Junior exempt
- JR = Junior Accelerator Programme entrant
- CO = College Accelerator Programme entrant
- NG = Next Gen Accelerator Program entrant
- w/o = Walkover
- r = Retired
- d = Defaulted

=== Finals ===
Quarterfinals
13	Anastasia Pavlyuchenkova (ROC)	0	6	3
9	Belinda Bencic (SUI)	6	3	6
15	Elena Rybakina (KAZ)	7	6
7	Garbiñe Muguruza (ESP)	5	1
Camila Giorgi (ITA)	4	4
4	Elina Svitolina (UKR)	6	6
Paula Badosa (ESP)	3	0^{r}
Markéta Vondroušová (CZE)	6	0

Semifinals
9	Belinda Bencic (SUI)	7^{7}	4	6
15	Elena Rybakina (KAZ)	6^{2}	6	3
4	Elina Svitolina (UKR)	3	1
Markéta Vondroušová (CZE)	6	6

Final
9	Belinda Bencic (SUI)	7	2	6
Markéta Vondroušová (CZE)	5	6	3
Third place
15	Elena Rybakina (KAZ)	6	6^{5}	4
4	Elina Svitolina (UKR)	1	7^{7}	6

=== Top half ===
==== Section 1 ====
First round
1	A Barty (AUS)	4	3
S Sorribes Tormo (ESP)	6	6
F Ferro (FRA)	2	6	6
A Sevastova (LAT)	6	4	2
ITF	A-L Friedsam (GER)	7^{7}	6
H Watson (GBR)	6^{5}	3
ITF	S Errani (ITA)	0	1
13	A Pavlyuchenkova (ROC)	6	6
9	B Bencic (SUI)	6	6
J Pegula (USA)	3	3
M Doi (JPN)	6	6
Alt	R Zarazúa (MEX)	3	2
LA Fernandez (CAN)	6	3	6
D Yastremska (UKR)	3	6	0
Z Diyas (KAZ)	2^{r}
8	B Krejčíková (CZE)	5

Second round
S Sorribes Tormo (ESP)	6	6
F Ferro (FRA)	1	4
ITF	A-L Friedsam (GER)	1	1
13	A Pavlyuchenkova (ROC)	6	6
9	B Bencic (SUI)	6	6
M Doi (JPN)	2	4
LA Fernandez (CAN)	2	4
8	B Krejčíková (CZE)	6	6

Third round
S Sorribes Tormo (ESP)	1	3
13	A Pavlyuchenkova (ROC)	6	6
9	B Bencic (SUI)	1	6	6
8	B Krejčíková (CZE)	6	2	3

Quarterfinals
13	A Pavlyuchenkova (ROC)	0	6	3
9	B Bencic (SUI)	6	3	6

==== Section 2 ====
First round
3	A Sabalenka (BLR)	6	6
M Linette (POL)	2	1
C Garcia (FRA)	2	7^{7}	3
D Vekić (CRO)	6	6^{2}	6
ITF	M Sherif (EGY)	5	6^{1}
R Peterson (SWE)	7	7^{7}
ITF	S Stosur (AUS)	4	2
15	E Rybakina (KAZ)	6	6
10	P Kvitová (CZE)	6	6
J Paolini (ITA)	4	3
PR	I Jorović (SRB)	3	2
A Van Uytvanck (BEL)	6	6
ITF	V Cepede Royg (PAR)	4	3
ITF	Q Wang (CHN)	6	6
V Kudermetova (ROC)	5	5
7	G Muguruza (ESP)	7	7

Second round
3	A Sabalenka (BLR)	4	6	6^{3}
D Vekić (CRO)	6	3	7^{7}
R Peterson (SWE)	2	3
15	E Rybakina (KAZ)	6	6
10	P Kvitová (CZE)	7	3	0
A Van Uytvanck (BEL)	5	6	6
ITF	Q Wang (CHN)	3	0
7	G Muguruza (ESP)	6	6

Third round
D Vekić (CRO)	6^{3}	4
15	E Rybakina (KAZ)	7^{7}	6
A Van Uytvanck (BEL)	4	1
7	G Muguruza (ESP)	6	6

Quarterfinals
15	E Rybakina (KAZ)	7	6
7	G Muguruza (ESP)	5	1

=== Bottom half ===
==== Section 3 ====
First round
5	Ka Plíšková (CZE)	6	6
A Cornet (FRA)	1	3
PR	C Suárez Navarro (ESP)	6	6
O Jabeur (TUN)	4	1
J Ostapenko (LAT)	4	7^{7}	4
PR	E Vesnina (ROC)	6	6^{2}	6
C Giorgi (ITA)	6	6
11	J Brady (USA)	3	2
14	M Sakkari (GRE)	7	6
A Kontaveit (EST)	5	2
N Stojanović (SRB)	6	6
N Hibino (JPN)	3	3
PR	Y Shvedova (KAZ)	5	2^{r}
A Tomljanović (AUS)	7	3
L Siegemund (GER)	3	7	4
4	E Svitolina (UKR)	6	5	6

Second round
5	Ka Plíšková (CZE)	6	6^{0}	6
PR	C Suárez Navarro (ESP)	3	7^{7}	1
PR	E Vesnina (ROC)	3	1
C Giorgi (ITA)	6	6
14	M Sakkari (GRE)	6	6
N Stojanović (SRB)	1	2
A Tomljanović (AUS)	6	3	4
4	E Svitolina (UKR)	4	6	6

Third round
5	Ka Plíšková (CZE)	4	2
C Giorgi (ITA)	6	6
14	M Sakkari (GRE)	7	3	4
4	E Svitolina (UKR)	5	6	6

Quarterfinals
C Giorgi (ITA)	4	4
4	E Svitolina (UKR)	6	6

==== Section 4 ====
First round
6	I Świątek (POL)	6	6
PR	M Barthel (GER)	2	2
P Badosa (ESP)	6^{4}	6	6
K Mladenovic (FRA)	7^{7}	3	0
Y Putintseva (KAZ)	6^{4}	3^{r}
ITF	N Podoroska (ARG)	7^{7}	1
E Alexandrova (ROC)	4	6	6
12	E Mertens (BEL)	6	4	4
16	K Bertens (NED)	4	6	4
M Vondroušová (CZE)	6	3	6
ITF	M Buzărnescu (ROU)	6^{0}	7	6
A Riske (USA)	7^{7}	5	4
C Osorio (COL)	4	1
V Golubic (SUI)	6	6
S Zheng (CHN)	1	4
2	N Osaka (JPN)	6	6

Second round
6	I Świątek (POL)	3	6^{4}
P Badosa (ESP)	6	7^{7}
ITF	N Podoroska (ARG)	6	6
E Alexandrova (ROC)	1	3
M Vondroušová (CZE)	6	6
ITF	M Buzǎrnescu (ROU)	1	2
V Golubic (SUI)	3	2
2	N Osaka (JPN)	6	6

Third round
P Badosa (ESP)	6	6
ITF	N Podoroska (ARG)	2	3
M Vondroušová (CZE)	6	6
2	N Osaka (JPN)	1	4

Quarterfinals
P Badosa (ESP)	3	0^{r}
M Vondroušová (CZE)	6	0
