= Tennis at the 2020 Summer Olympics – Men's doubles =

Men's doubles
- Tennis at the 2020 Summer Olympics

Final
- Champions: (Croatia) Nikola Mektić (Croatia) Mate Pavić
- Runners-up: (Croatia) Marin Čilić (Croatia) Ivan Dodig
- Score: 6–4, 3–6, [10–6]

Events
Singles	men	women
Doubles	men	women	mixed
Qualification
- Summer Olympics

Men's doubles at the Games of the XXXII Olympiad
- Olympic tennis pictogram
- Venue: Ariake Coliseum
- Dates: 24–30 July 2021
- Competitors: 32 teams from 22 nations

Medalists
1st place, gold medalist(s)		Nikola Mektić; Mate Pavić	Croatia
2nd place, silver medalist(s)		Marin Čilić; Ivan Dodig	Croatia
3rd place, bronze medalist(s)		Marcus Daniell; Michael Venus	New Zealand

Croatia's Nikola Mektić and Mate Pavić defeated compatriots Marin Čilić and Ivan Dodig in the final, 6–4, 3–6, [10–6] to win the gold medal in Men's Doubles tennis at the 2020 Summer Olympics. This was Croatia's first Olympic tennis gold and silver medals. For the first time since 1908, the gold medal match was contested by pairs representing the same country. In the bronze medal match, New Zealand's Marcus Daniell and Michael Venus defeated the United States' Austin Krajicek and Tennys Sandgren, 7–6^{(7–3)}, 6–2. It was New Zealand's first Olympic tennis medal.

Spain's Marc López and Rafael Nadal were the reigning gold medalists from 2016, but they chose not to participate.

This was the 16th (medal) appearance of the men's doubles tennis event. The event has been held at every Summer Olympics where tennis has been on the program: from 1896 to 1924 and then from 1988 to the current program. A demonstration event was held in 1968.

The competition was a single-elimination tournament with a bronze medal match. Matches were best-of-3 sets, except that the third set was a match tiebreak (first to 10 points) instead of a typical set. A tiebreak was played if one of the first two sets reached 6–6.

== Qualification ==
Each National Olympic Committee (NOC) can enter up to two pairs (four players). The total number of male players, in both singles and doubles, for each nation may not exceed six. There are 32 pairs places (64 players) in the event. Qualification is based primarily on the ranking lists of 7 June 2021.

Up to 10 pairs are selected through individual doubles ranking. The top 10 players in the doubles ranking qualify and may bring any partner with a ranking in the top 300 in either singles or doubles.

The draw is then filled to 24 pairs (that is, at least 14 additional pairs and possibly more depending on how the top 10 use their spots) through combined ranking. The better of a player's singles or doubles ranking is used, and the two rankings of a pair of players are added to give a combined ranking, with the lowest rankings earning qualifying spots.

If the quota of 86 total male players in singles and doubles has not been reached, the combined ranking continues until either the 86 total quota places are filled or the 32 pair maximum is reached.

Once the 86 player quota is met, priority is given to pairs with both members playing in singles (with combined ranking used to select within that group). In the unlikely event that this does not finish filling the 32 pairs, additional spots will be qualified with priority given to pairs with one member playing in singles; finally, if the 32 pair spots still are not filled, the combined ranking of pairs without any singles players is used.

== Schedule ==
The competition was held over seven days from 24 July to 30 July. Times given are the start of tennis sessions, though the men's doubles shares courts with other tennis events.

July
24	25	26	27	28	29	30
11:00	11:00	11:00	11:00	11:00	15:00	15:00
Round of 32		Round of 16		Quarter-finals	Semi-finals	Bronze medal match
Round of 32		Round of 16		Quarter-finals	Semi-finals	Gold medal match

All times are Japan Standard Time (UTC+9)

== Seeds ==
1. Nikola Mektić (CRO) / Mate Pavić (CRO) (champions, gold medalists)
2. Pierre-Hugues Herbert (FRA) / Nicolas Mahut (FRA) (first round)
3. Juan Sebastián Cabal (COL) / Robert Farah (COL) (quarterfinals)
4. Aslan Karatsev (ROC) / Daniil Medvedev (ROC) (first round)

5. Hubert Hurkacz (POL) / Łukasz Kubot (POL) (first round)
6. Karen Khachanov (ROC) / Andrey Rublev (ROC) (first round)
7. Jamie Murray (GBR) / Neal Skupski (GBR) (second round)
8. Wesley Koolhof (NED) / Jean-Julien Rojer (NED) (second round, withdrew due to a positive test for COVID-19)

== Draw ==
Key

- Q = Qualifier
- WC = Wild card
- LL = Lucky loser
- Alt = Alternate
- ITF = ITF entry
- PR = Protected ranking
- SR = Special ranking
- SE = Special exempt
- JE = Junior exempt
- JR = Junior Accelerator Programme entrant
- CO = College Accelerator Programme entrant
- NG = Next Gen Accelerator Program entrant
- w/o = Walkover
- r = Retired
- d = Defaulted

=== Finals ===
Semi-finals
1	Nikola Mektić (CRO); Mate Pavić (CRO)	6	6
Austin Krajicek (USA); Tennys Sandgren (USA)	4	4
Marcus Daniell (NZL); Michael Venus (NZL)	2	2
Marin Čilić (CRO); Ivan Dodig (CRO)	6	6

Final
1	Nikola Mektić (CRO); Mate Pavić (CRO)	6	3	[10]
Marin Čilić (CRO); Ivan Dodig (CRO)	4	6	[6]
Bronze medal
Austin Krajicek (USA); Tennys Sandgren (USA)	6^{3}	2
Marcus Daniell (NZL); Michael Venus (NZL)	7^{7}	6

=== Top half ===
First round
1	N Mektić (CRO); M Pavić (CRO)	7^{8}	6
M Demoliner (BRA); M Melo (BRA)	6^{6}	4
P Andújar (ESP); R Carballés Baena (ESP)	5	4
L Musetti (ITA); L Sonego (ITA)	7	6
ITF	B McLachlan (JPN); K Nishikori (JPN)	6	6
J Sousa (POR); P Sousa (POR)	1	4
A Molteni (ARG); H Zeballos (ARG)	7^{7}	4	[11]
7	J Murray (GBR); N Skupski (GBR)	6^{3}	6	[13]
4	A Karatsev (ROC); D Medvedev (ROC)	5	4
L Klein (SVK); F Polášek (SVK)	7	6
J Peers (AUS); M Purcell (AUS)	6	6^{5}	[5]
A Krajicek (USA); T Sandgren (USA)	3	7^{7}	[10]
A Bublik (KAZ); A Golubev (KAZ)	7^{7}	6^{3}	[8]
J Chardy (FRA); G Monfils (FRA)	6^{4}	7^{7}	[10]
J-L Struff (GER); A Zverev (GER)	6	7^{7}
5	H Hurkacz (POL); Ł Kubot (POL)	2	6^{5}

Second round
1	N Mektić (CRO); M Pavić (CRO)	7	6^{5}	[10]
L Musetti (ITA); L Sonego (ITA)	5	7^{7}	[7]
ITF	B McLachlan (JPN); K Nishikori (JPN)	6	6
7	J Murray (GBR); N Skupski (GBR)	3	4
L Klein (SVK); F Polášek (SVK)	7^{7}	2	[5]
A Krajicek (USA); T Sandgren (USA)	6^{2}	6	[10]
J Chardy (FRA); G Monfils (FRA)	4	5
J-L Struff (GER); A Zverev (GER)	6	7

Quarter-finals
1	N Mektić (CRO); M Pavić (CRO)	6	6
ITF	B McLachlan (JPN); K Nishikori (JPN)	3	3
A Krajicek (USA); T Sandgren (USA)	6	7^{7}
J-L Struff (GER); A Zverev (GER)	3	6^{4}

Semi-finals
1	N Mektić (CRO); M Pavić (CRO)	6	6
A Krajicek (USA); T Sandgren (USA)	4	4

=== Bottom half ===
First round
8	W Koolhof (NED); J-J Rojer (NED)	6	7^{7}
S Gillé (BEL); J Vliegen (BEL)	3	6^{5}
E Gerasimov (BLR); I Ivashka (BLR)	3	6^{6}
M Daniell (NZL); M Venus (NZL)	6	7^{8}
J Millman (AUS); L Saville (AUS)	5	2
O Marach (AUT); P Oswald (AUT)	7	6
P Carreño Busta (ESP); A Davidovich Fokina (ESP)	2	4
3	JS Cabal (COL); R Farah (COL)	6	6
6	K Khachanov (ROC); A Rublev (ROC)	7^{7}	6^{5}	[10]
R Ram (USA); F Tiafoe (USA)	6^{3}	7^{7}	[12]
T Daniel (JPN); Y Nishioka (JPN)	2	4
M Čilić (CRO); I Dodig (CRO)	6	6
K Krawietz (GER); T Pütz (GER)	6	6
F Bagnis (ARG); D Schwartzman (ARG)	2	1
A Murray (GBR); J Salisbury (GBR)	6	6
2	P-H Herbert (FRA); N Mahut (FRA)	3	2

Second round
8	W Koolhof (NED); J-J Rojer (NED)
M Daniell (NZL); M Venus (NZL)	w/o
O Marach (AUT); P Oswald (AUT)	4	1
3	JS Cabal (COL); R Farah (COL)	6	6
R Ram (USA); F Tiafoe (USA)	3	5
M Čilić (CRO); I Dodig (CRO)	6	7
K Krawietz (GER); T Pütz (GER)	2	6^{2}
A Murray (GBR); J Salisbury (GBR)	6	7^{7}

Quarter-finals
M Daniell (NZL); M Venus (NZL)	6	3	[10]
3	JS Cabal (COL); R Farah (COL)	3	6	[7]
M Čilić (CRO); I Dodig (CRO)	4	7^{7}	[10]
A Murray (GBR); J Salisbury (GBR)	6	6^{2}	[7]

Semi-finals
M Daniell (NZL); M Venus (NZL)	2	2
M Čilić (CRO); I Dodig (CRO)	6	6
