= Tennis at the 2020 Summer Olympics – Men's singles =

Men's singles
- Tennis at the 2020 Summer Olympics

Final
- Champion: (Germany) Alexander Zverev
- Runner-up: Karen Khachanov
- Score: 6–3, 6–1

Events
Singles	men	women
Doubles	men	women	mixed
Qualification
- Summer Olympics

Men's singles at the Games of the XXXII Olympiad
- Venue: Ariake Coliseum
- Dates: 24 July – 1 August 2021
- Competitors: 64 from 31 nations

Medalists
1st place, gold medalist(s)		Alexander Zverev	Germany
2nd place, silver medalist(s)		Karen Khachanov	ROC
3rd place, bronze medalist(s)		Pablo Carreño Busta	Spain

Germany's Alexander Zverev defeated Karen Khachanov of the Russian Olympic Committee in the final, 6–3, 6–1 to win the gold medal in men's singles tennis at the 2020 Summer Olympics. It was both countries' first medals at the event since 2000, and Germany's first victory. In the bronze medal match, Spain's Pablo Carreño Busta defeated Serbia's Novak Djokovic, 6–4, 6–7^{(6–8)}, 6–3.

64 players from 31 nations competed.

Andy Murray was the two-time reigning gold medalist, but withdrew before his first-round match due to a quadriceps strain.

World No. 1 Djokovic was attempting to complete the Career Golden Slam, but he lost to Zverev in the semifinals. Djokovic would win the gold medal at the next Olympic games.

The medals for the competition were presented by Nenad Lalović, IOC Executive Board Member; Serbia; and the medalists' bouquets were presented by David Haggerty, ITF President; United States.

== Background ==
This was the 16th (medal) appearance of the men's singles tennis event. The event has been held at every Summer Olympics where tennis has been on the program: from 1896 to 1924 and then from 1988 to the current program. Demonstration events were held in 1968 and 1984.

Novak Djokovic was the favourite entering the tournament having won the first 3-consecutive Grand Slam titles of the 2021 season. It is worth mentioning that although it is the 2020 Olympic Games and branded as Tokyo 2020, because of the COVID-19 pandemic, the Games were postponed until July 2021. Top players not present, along with two-time defending champion Andy Murray, included, world №3 Rafael Nadal, №4 Dominic Thiem; №8 Roger Federer, №9 Matteo Berrettini, №10 Diego Schwartzman, №11 Roberto Bautista Agut, and Stan Wawrinka.

Egypt made its men's singles debut. France made its 15th appearance, most among all nations, having missed only the 1904 event.

== Qualification ==
Each National Olympic Committee (NOC) can enter up to four players. Nations had been limited to four players in the event since the 2000 Games. Qualification for the men's singles is primarily through the ATP ranking list of 7 June 2021. An additional restriction is that players had to have been part of a nominated team for three Davis Cup events between 2017 and 2020 (with some exceptions). There are 64 quota places available for men's singles.

The first 56 are assigned through the world ranking.

There are six places available through continental qualification: four through continental tournaments (two in the 2019 Pan American Games, one in the 2018 Asian Games, and one in the 2019 African Games) and two through continent-restricted world ranking (one each for Europe and Oceania, which must come from NOCs with no other qualified competitors). The four continental tournament places take precedence over the world ranking, so the winners (João Menezes, Marcelo Tomás Barrios Vera, Denis Istomin, and Mohamed Safwat) are not counted toward the 56 (but are counted toward the four-per-nation limit).

One place is guaranteed to the host nation. If Japan earns a place through the world ranking, the host guarantee is not used and a 57th place is added to the ranking.

In an unusual career accomplishment qualification process, one spot is reserved for a former Olympic or Grand Slam champion that has not qualified through the current world rankings. The player must have won an Olympic gold medal or a Grand Slam singles final, be within the top 300 ranked players, and be from a nation that has not already qualified four players. If multiple players meet those criteria, the one with the most titles qualifies; if still tied, the highest ranked player qualifies. If no players meet those criteria, an additional place (57th or 58th) is added to the ranking. For the 2020 Games, this 'career wild card' quota was initially held by reigning double Olympic champion and three-time Grand Slam winner Andy Murray, but he was given a direct entry after several players withdrew. However he withdrew before he was due to play his first round match due to an injury.

== Competition format ==
The competition was a single-elimination tournament with a bronze medal match. Matches were best-of-3 sets. A tiebreak was played in all sets reaching 6–6, including the last set of a match. In a change from previous Olympics editions, the men's final was played over three rather than five sets, for compensation to players who are competing in the later stages in all three categories: singles, doubles and mixed.

== Schedule ==
The competition is held over nine days from 24 July to 1 August. Times given are the start of tennis sessions, though the men's singles shares courts with other tennis events.

July								August
24	25	26	27	28	29	30	31	1
11:00	11:00	11:00	11:00	11:00	15:00	15:00	15:00	15:00
Round of 64		Round of 32		Round of 16	Quarter-finals	Semi-finals	Bronze medal match	Gold medal match

All times are Japan Standard Time (UTC+9)

== Seeds ==
1. Novak Djokovic (SRB) (semifinals, fourth place)
2. Daniil Medvedev (ROC) (quarterfinals)
3. Stefanos Tsitsipas (GRE) (third round)
4. Alexander Zverev (GER) (champion, gold medalist)
5. Andrey Rublev (ROC) (first round)
6. Pablo Carreño Busta (ESP) (semifinals, bronze medalist)
7. Hubert Hurkacz (POL) (second round)
8. Diego Schwartzman (ARG) (third round)
9. Félix Auger-Aliassime (CAN) (first round)
10. Gaël Monfils (FRA) (first round)
11. Aslan Karatsev (ROC) (second round)
12. Karen Khachanov (ROC) (final, silver medalist)
13. Lorenzo Sonego (ITA) (second round)
14. Ugo Humbert (FRA) (quarterfinals)
15. Fabio Fognini (ITA) (third round)
16. Alejandro Davidovich Fokina (ESP) (third round)

Click on the seed number of a player to go to their draw section.

== Draw ==
Key

- Q = Qualifier
- WC = Wild card
- LL = Lucky loser
- Alt = Alternate
- ITF = ITF entry
- PR = Protected ranking
- SR = Special ranking
- SE = Special exempt
- JE = Junior exempt
- JR = Junior Accelerator Programme entrant
- CO = College Accelerator Programme entrant
- NG = Next Gen Accelerator Program entrant
- w/o = Walkover
- r = Retired
- d = Defaulted

=== Finals ===
Quarterfinals
1	Novak Djokovic (SRB)	6	6
Kei Nishikori (JPN)	2	0
4	Alexander Zverev (GER)	6	6
Jérémy Chardy (FRA)	4	1
12	Karen Khachanov (ROC)	7^{7}	4	6
14	Ugo Humbert (FRA)	6^{4}	6	3
6	Pablo Carreño Busta (ESP)	6	7^{7}
2	Daniil Medvedev (ROC)	2	6^{5}

Semifinals
1	Novak Djokovic (SRB)	6	3	1
4	Alexander Zverev (GER)	1	6	6
12	Karen Khachanov (ROC)	6	6
6	Pablo Carreño Busta (ESP)	3	3

Final (gold medal match)
4	Alexander Zverev (GER)	6	6
12	Karen Khachanov (ROC)	3	1
Bronze medal match
1	Novak Djokovic (SRB)	4	7^{8}	3
6	Pablo Carreño Busta (ESP)	6	6^{6}	6

=== Top half ===
==== Section 1 ====
First round
1	N Djokovic (SRB)	6	6
H Dellien (BOL)	2	2
J-L Struff (GER)	6	6
T Monteiro (BRA)	3	4
L Musetti (ITA)	3	4
J Millman (AUS)	6	6
P Sousa (POR)	3	0
16	A Davidovich Fokina (ESP)	6	6
10	G Monfils (FRA)	4	6	5
I Ivashka (BLR)	6	4	7
M Kukushkin (KAZ)	7^{7}	7
F Coria (ARG)	6^{4}	5
N Gombos (SVK)	6^{4}	6	2
M Giron (USA)	7^{7}	3	6
K Nishikori (JPN)	6	6
5	A Rublev (ROC)	3	4

Second round
1	N Djokovic (SRB)	6	6
J-L Struff (GER)	4	3
J Millman (AUS)	4	7^{7}	3
16	A Davidovich Fokina (ESP)	6	6^{4}	6
I Ivashka (BLR)	6^{4}	6	6
M Kukushkin (KAZ)	7^{7}	3	3
M Giron (USA)	6^{5}	6	1
K Nishikori (JPN)	7^{7}	3	6

Third round
1	N Djokovic (SRB)	6	6
16	A Davidovich Fokina (ESP)	3	1
I Ivashka (BLR)	6^{7}	0
K Nishikori (JPN)	7^{9}	6

Quarterfinals
1	N Djokovic (SRB)	6	6
K Nishikori (JPN)	2	0

==== Section 2 ====
First round
4	A Zverev (GER)	6	6
PR	Y-h Lu (TPE)	1	3
DE Galán (COL)	7	6
ITF	M Safwat (EGY)	5	1
N Basilashvili (GEO)	6	6
R Carballés Baena (ESP)	3	2
T Daniel (JPN)	6	6^{6}	6^{3}
13	L Sonego (ITA)	4	7^{8}	7^{7}
11	A Karatsev (ROC)	6	6
T Paul (USA)	3	2
J Chardy (FRA)	6	7^{7}
ITF	MT Barrios Vera (CHI)	1	6^{4}
F Cerúndolo (ARG)	5	7^{7}	2
ITF	L Broady (GBR)	7	6^{4}	6
Alt	L Saville (AUS)	2	4
7	H Hurkacz (POL)	6	6

Second round
4	A Zverev (GER)	6	6
DE Galán (COL)	2	2
N Basilashvili (GEO)	6	3	6
13	L Sonego (ITA)	4	6	4
11	A Karatsev (ROC)	5	6	3
J Chardy (FRA)	7	4	6
ITF	L Broady (GBR)	7	3	6
7	H Hurkacz (POL)	5	6	3

Third round
4	A Zverev (GER)	6	7^{7}
N Basilashvili (GEO)	4	6^{5}
J Chardy (FRA)	7^{7}	4	6
ITF	L Broady (GBR)	6^{3}	6	1

Quarterfinals
4	A Zverev (GER)	6	6
J Chardy (FRA)	4	1

=== Bottom half ===
==== Section 3 ====
First round
8	D Schwartzman (ARG)	7	6
ITF	JP Varillas (PER)	5	4
ITF	T Macháč (CZE)	6^{5}	6	6
J Sousa (POR)	7^{7}	4	4
Alt	L Klein (SVK)	7	3	6^{4}
J Duckworth (AUS)	5	6	7^{7}
Y Nishioka (JPN)	6	1	2
12	K Khachanov (ROC)	3	6	6
14	U Humbert (FRA)	7^{7}	6
P Andújar (ESP)	6^{3}	1
K Majchrzak (POL)	4	2
M Kecmanović (SRB)	6	6
S-w Kwon (KOR)	3	2
F Tiafoe (USA)	6	6
PR	P Kohlschreiber (GER)	3	6	3
3	S Tsitsipas (GRE)	6	3	6

Second round
8	D Schwartzman (ARG)	6	7
ITF	T Macháč (CZE)	4	5
J Duckworth (AUS)	5	1
12	K Khachanov (ROC)	7	6
14	U Humbert (FRA)	4	7^{7}	7
M Kecmanović (SRB)	6	6^{5}	5
F Tiafoe (USA)	3	4
3	S Tsitsipas (GRE)	6	6

Third round
8	D Schwartzman (ARG)	1	6	1
12	K Khachanov (ROC)	6	2	6
14	U Humbert (FRA)	2	7^{7}	6
3	S Tsitsipas (GRE)	6	6^{4}	2

Quarterfinals
12	K Khachanov (ROC)	7^{7}	4	6
14	U Humbert (FRA)	6^{4}	6	3

==== Section 4 ====
First round
6	P Carreño Busta (ESP)	7	6
T Sandgren (USA)	5	2
M Čilić (CRO)	6^{5}	7	7^{9}
ITF	J Menezes (BRA)	7^{7}	5	6^{7}
D Koepfer (GER)	3	6	7
F Bagnis (ARG)	6	3	5
Alt	M Purcell (AUS)	6	7^{7}
9	F Auger-Aliassime (CAN)	4	6^{2}
15	F Fognini (ITA)	6	6
Y Sugita (JPN)	4	3
E Gerasimov (BLR)	4	6	6
G Simon (FRA)	6	3	4
ITF	S Nagal (IND)	6	6^{6}	6
ITF	D Istomin (UZB)	4	7^{8}	4
A Bublik (KAZ)	4	6^{8}
2	D Medvedev (ROC)	6	7^{10}

Second round
6	P Carreño Busta (ESP)	5	6	6
M Čilić (CRO)	7	4	4
D Koepfer (GER)	6	6
Alt	M Purcell (AUS)	3	0
15	F Fognini (ITA)	6	7^{7}
E Gerasimov (BLR)	4	6^{4}
ITF	S Nagal (IND)	2	1
2	D Medvedev (ROC)	6	6

Third round
6	P Carreño Busta (ESP)	7^{9}	6
D Koepfer (GER)	6^{7}	3
15	F Fognini (ITA)	2	6	2
2	D Medvedev (ROC)	6	3	6

Quarterfinals
6	P Carreño Busta (ESP)	6	7^{7}
2	D Medvedev (ROC)	2	6^{5}
