= Tennis at the 2020 Summer Olympics – Women's doubles =

Women's doubles
- Tennis at the 2020 Summer Olympics

Final
- Champions: (Czech Republic) Barbora Krejčíková (Czech Republic) Kateřina Siniaková
- Runners-up: (Switzerland) Belinda Bencic (Switzerland) Viktorija Golubic
- Score: 7–5, 6–1

Events
Singles	men	women
Doubles	men	women	mixed
Qualification
- Summer Olympics

Women's doubles at the Games of the XXXII Olympiad
- Olympic tennis pictogram
- Venue: Ariake Coliseum
- Dates: 24 July – 1 August 2021
- Competitors: 32 teams from 23 nations

Medalists
1st place, gold medalist(s)		Barbora Krejčíková; Kateřina Siniaková; Czech Republic
2nd place, silver medalist(s)		Belinda Bencic; Viktorija Golubic; Switzerland
3rd place, bronze medalist(s)		Laura Pigossi; Luisa Stefani; Brazil

The Czech Republic's Barbora Krejčíková and Kateřina Siniaková defeated Switzerland's Belinda Bencic and Viktorija Golubic in the final, 7–5, 6–1 to win the gold medal in women's doubles tennis at the 2020 Summer Olympics. It was the Czech Republic's first victory in women's doubles, and its third consecutive medal. In the bronze medal match, Brazil's Laura Pigossi and Luisa Stefani defeated Veronika Kudermetova and Elena Vesnina of the Russian Olympic Committee, 4–6, 6–4, [11–9]. It was Brazil's first Olympic tennis medal.

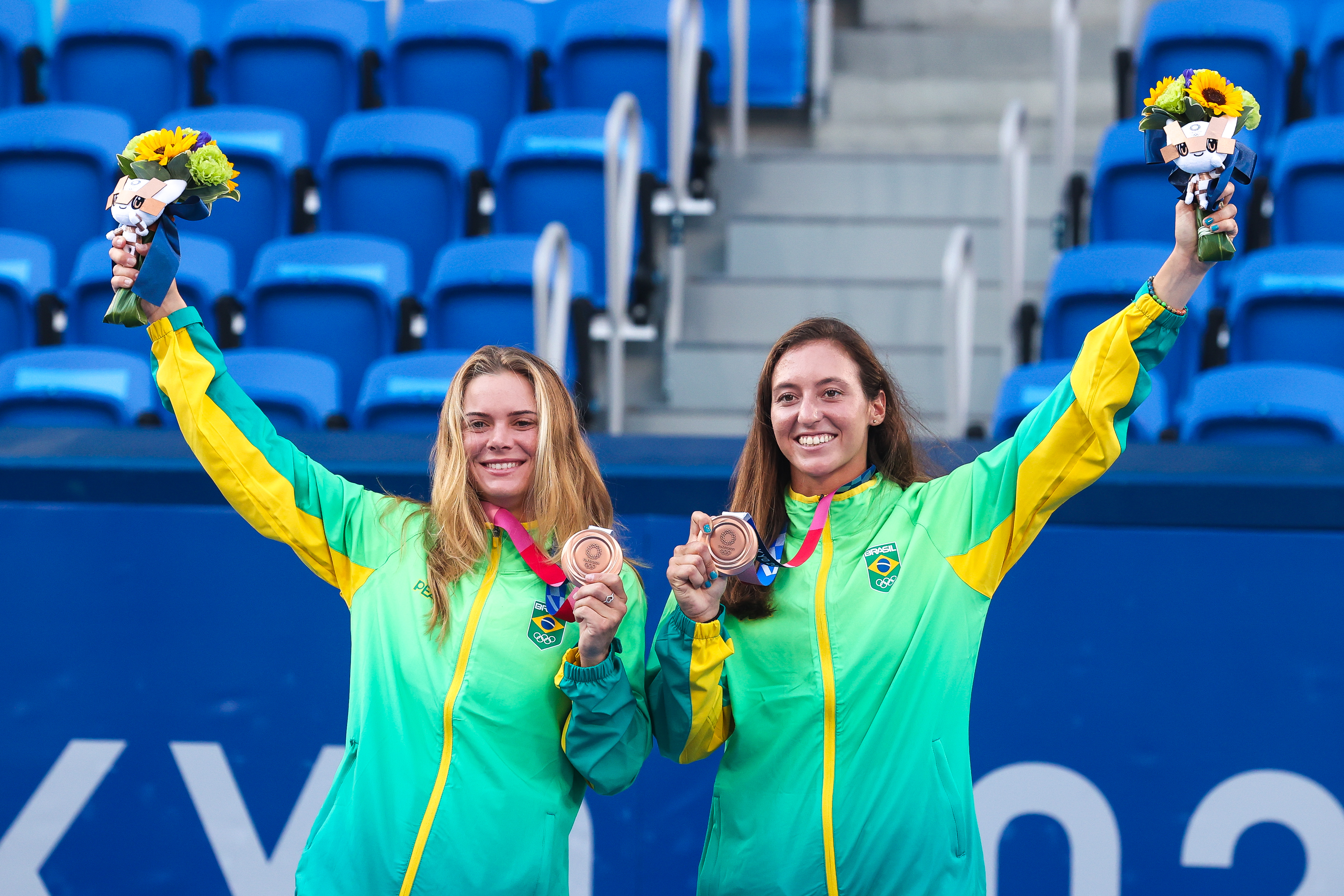
Laura Pigossi and Luisa Stefani from Brazil, winners of the bronze medal.

Ekaterina Makarova and Vesnina were the reigning gold medalists from 2016, but Makarova retired from tennis in 2020. Vesnina attempted to defend the title with Kudermetova, but they lost in the semifinals.

The competition was a single-elimination tournament with a bronze-medal match. Matches were best-of-3 sets, except that the third set is a match tiebreak (first to 10 points) instead of a typical set. A tiebreak was played if one of the first two sets reaches 6–6.

This tournament marked the final appearance of former world No. 4 Kiki Bertens of the Netherlands before her retirement. She partnered with Demi Schuurs; they lost in the second round to Kudermetova and Vesnina.

== Schedule ==
The competition was held over nine days from 24 July to 1 August. Times given were the start of tennis sessions, though the women's doubles shared courts with other tennis events.

July								August
24	25	26	27	28	29	30	31	1
11:00	11:00	11:00	11:00	11:00	15:00		15:00	15:00
Round of 32		Round of 16		Quarter-finals	Semi-finals		Bronze medal match	Gold medal match

All times are Japan Standard Time (UTC+9)

== Seeds ==
1. Barbora Krejčíková (CZE) / Kateřina Siniaková (CZE) (champions, gold medalists)
2. Shuko Aoyama (JPN) / Ena Shibahara (JPN) (first round)
3. Kiki Bertens (NED) / Demi Schuurs (NED) (second round)
4. Bethanie Mattek-Sands (USA) / Jessica Pegula (USA) (quarterfinals)
5. Chan Hao-ching (TPE) / Latisha Chan (TPE) (first round)
6. Ashleigh Barty (AUS) / Storm Sanders (AUS) (quarterfinals)
7. Gabriela Dabrowski (CAN) / Sharon Fichman (CAN) (first round)
8. Nicole Melichar (USA) / Alison Riske (USA) (first round)

== Draw ==
Key

- Q = Qualifier
- WC = Wild card
- LL = Lucky loser
- Alt = Alternate
- ITF = ITF entry
- PR = Protected ranking
- SR = Special ranking
- SE = Special exempt
- JE = Junior exempt
- JR = Junior Accelerator Programme entrant
- CO = College Accelerator Programme entrant
- NG = Next Gen Accelerator Program entrant
- w/o = Walkover
- r = Retired
- d = Defaulted

=== Finals ===
Semifinals
1	Barbora Krejčíková (CZE); Kateřina Siniaková (CZE)	6	3	[10]
PR	Veronika Kudermetova (ROC); Elena Vesnina (ROC)	3	6	[6]
Laura Pigossi (BRA); Luisa Stefani (BRA)	5	3
Belinda Bencic (SUI); Viktorija Golubic (SUI)	7	6

Final (gold-medal match)
1	Barbora Krejčíková (CZE); Kateřina Siniaková (CZE)	7	6
Belinda Bencic (SUI); Viktorija Golubic (SUI)	5	1
Bronze-medal match
PR	Veronika Kudermetova (ROC); Elena Vesnina (ROC)	6	4	[9]
Laura Pigossi (BRA); Luisa Stefani (BRA)	4	6	[11]

=== Top half ===
First round
1	B Krejčíková (CZE); K Siniaková (CZE)	6	6
Y-c Hsieh (TPE); C-y Hsu (TPE)	2	1
G Olmos (MEX); R Zarazúa (MEX)	2	7^{7}	[7]
P Badosa (ESP); S Sorribes Tormo (ESP)	6	6^{4}	[10]
Y Xu (CHN); Z Yang (CHN)	4	6	[18]
A Krunić (SRB); N Stojanović (SRB)	6	4	[16]
N Hibino (JPN); M Ninomiya (JPN)	1	2
6	A Barty (AUS); S Sanders (AUS)	6	6
3	K Bertens (NED); D Schuurs (NED)	7^{7}	5	[11]
C Garcia (FRA); K Mladenovic (FRA)	6^{4}	7	[9]
PR	V Kudermetova (ROC); E Vesnina (ROC)	6	7
A-L Friedsam (GER); L Siegemund (GER)	2	5
L Kichenok (UKR); N Kichenok (UKR)	0	7^{7}	[10]
PR	S Mirza (IND); A Raina (IND)	6	6^{0}	[8]
Alt	S Errani (ITA); J Paolini (ITA)	6	5	[10]
8	N Melichar (USA); A Riske (USA)	3	7	[2]

Second round
1	B Krejčíková (CZE); K Siniaková (CZE)	6	5	[10]
P Badosa (ESP); S Sorribes Tormo (ESP)	2	7	[5]
Y Xu (CHN); Z Yang (CHN)	4	4
6	A Barty (AUS); S Sanders (AUS)	6	6
3	K Bertens (NED); D Schuurs (NED)	2	6	[7]
PR	V Kudermetova (ROC); E Vesnina (ROC)	6	3	[10]
L Kichenok (UKR); N Kichenok (UKR)	7^{7}	6
Alt	S Errani (ITA); J Paolini (ITA)	6^{4}	2

Quarterfinals
1	B Krejčíková (CZE); K Siniaková (CZE)	3	6	[10]
6	A Barty (AUS); S Sanders (AUS)	6	4	[7]
PR	V Kudermetova (ROC); E Vesnina (ROC)	6	6
L Kichenok (UKR); N Kichenok (UKR)	2	1

Semifinals
1	B Krejčíková (CZE); K Siniaková (CZE)	6	3	[10]
PR	V Kudermetova (ROC); E Vesnina (ROC)	3	6	[6]

=== Bottom half ===
First round
7	G Dabrowski (CAN); S Fichman (CAN)	6^{3}	4
L Pigossi (BRA); L Stefani (BRA)	7^{7}	6
Ka Plíšková (CZE); M Vondroušová (CZE)	6	6
Y Duan (CHN); S Zheng (CHN)	2	1
A Cornet (FRA); F Ferro (FRA)	6	6
E Svitolina (UKR); D Yastremska (UKR)	2	4
M Linette (POL); A Rosolska (POL)	1	3
4	B Mattek-Sands (USA); J Pegula (USA)	6	6
5	H-c Chan (TPE); L Chan (TPE)	5	6	[6]
M Niculescu (ROU); R Olaru (ROU)	7	1	[10]
E Perez (AUS); S Stosur (AUS)	4	6	[10]
J Ostapenko (LAT); A Sevastova (LAT)	6	1	[5]
PR	G Muguruza (ESP); C Suárez Navarro (ESP)	6	7^{7}
E Mertens (BEL); A Van Uytvanck (BEL)	3	6^{4}
B Bencic (SUI); V Golubic (SUI)	6	6^{5}	[10]
2/ITF	S Aoyama (JPN); E Shibahara (JPN)	4	7^{7}	[5]

Second round
L Pigossi (BRA); L Stefani (BRA)	2	6	[13]
Ka Plíšková (CZE); M Vondroušová (CZE)	6	4	[11]
A Cornet (FRA); F Ferro (FRA)	1	4
4	B Mattek-Sands (USA); J Pegula (USA)	6	6
M Niculescu (ROU); R Olaru (ROU)	6^{3}	5
E Perez (AUS); S Stosur (AUS)	7^{7}	7
PR	G Muguruza (ESP); C Suárez Navarro (ESP)	6	1	[9]
B Bencic (SUI); V Golubic (SUI)	3	6	[11]

Quarterfinals
L Pigossi (BRA); L Stefani (BRA)	1	6	[10]
4	B Mattek-Sands (USA); J Pegula (USA)	6	3	[6]
E Perez (AUS); S Stosur (AUS)	4	4
B Bencic (SUI); V Golubic (SUI)	6	6

Semifinals
L Pigossi (BRA); L Stefani (BRA)	5	3
B Bencic (SUI); V Golubic (SUI)	7	6

== See also ==
- Krejčíková–Siniaková doubles team
