= Swimming at the 2020 Summer Olympics – Qualification =

For the swimming competitions at the 2020 Summer Olympics, the following qualification systems were in place. As the Olympics was postponed to 2021 due to the COVID-19 pandemic, qualification ended on 27 June 2021.

== Qualifying standards ==
A National Olympic Committee (NOC) may enter a maximum of two qualified athletes in each individual event, but only if both athletes have attained the Olympic Qualifying Time (OQT). One athlete per event can potentially enter if they meet the Olympic Selection Time (OST) or if the quota of 878 athletes has not been targeted. NOCs may also permit swimmers regardless of time (one per gender) under a Universality place, since they have no swimmers reaching either of the standard entry times (OQT/OST).

In the relay events, a maximum of 16 qualifying teams in each relay event must be permitted to accumulate a total of 112 relay teams; each NOC may enter only one team. The first twelve teams in each relay event at the 2019 World Championships will automatically compete for the relay events at the Olympics; while the remaining four per relay event must obtain their fastest entry times based on the FINA World Rankings during the process.

Because of the exceptional circumstances related to COVID-19 crisis, the consequent Olympic delay, and the unprecedented two-year gap between the Worlds and the new date of the Games, FINA revised the universality rule that allowed a nation to enter the highest-ranked male and female swimmer, respectively, based upon the Points Table (2021 edition). Swimmers from NOCs, having achieved the OST allocated to the universality place, may be entered to a maximum of two individual events, whereas those without the OQT and OST were limited to enter in one individual event only.

Following the end of the qualification period, FINA will assess the number of athletes having achieved the OQT, the number of relay-only swimmers, and the number of Universality places, before inviting athletes with OST to fulfill the total quota of 878. Additionally, OST places will be distributed by event according to the position of the FINA World Rankings during the qualifying deadline.

The qualifying time standards must be obtained in World Championships, Continental Championships, Continental Qualification Events, National Championships and Trials, or International Competitions approved by FINA in the period between 1 March 2019 to 27 June 2021.

The initial FINA qualifying standards, still to be ratified, are as follows:

Men's events			Women's events		
Event	OQT	OST	Event	OQT	OST
50 m freestyle	22.01	22.67	50 m freestyle	24.77	25.51
100 m freestyle	48.57	50.03	100 m freestyle	54.38	56.01
200 m freestyle	1:47.02	1:50.23	200 m freestyle	1:57.28	2:00.80
400 m freestyle	3:46.78	3:53.58	400 m freestyle	4:07.90	4:15.34
800 m freestyle	7:54.31	8:08.54	800 m freestyle	8:33.36	8:48.76
1500 m freestyle	15:00.99	15:28.02	1500 m freestyle	16:32.04	17:01.80
100 m backstroke	53.85	55.47	100 m backstroke	1:00.25	1:02.06
200 m backstroke	1:57.50	2:01.03	200 m backstroke	2:10.39	2:14.30
100 m breaststroke	59.93	1:01.73	100 m breaststroke	1:07.07	1:09.08
200 m breaststroke	2:10.35	2:14.26	200 m breaststroke	2:25.52	2:29.89
100 m butterfly	51.96	53.52	100 m butterfly	57.92	59.66
200 m butterfly	1:56.48	1:59.97	200 m butterfly	2:08.43	2:12.28
200 m individual medley	1:59.67	2:03.26	200 m individual medley	2:12.56	2:16.54
400 m individual medley	4:15.84	4:21.46	400 m individual medley	4:38.53	4:46.89

== Individual events ==
Those who have achieved the Olympic Qualifying Time (OQT) or the Olympic Selection Time (OST), or have been guaranteed a Universality place are listed below for each of the following individual events.

=== Men's individual events ===
==== Men's 50 m freestyle ====
Qualification standard	No. of athletes	NOC	Qualified swimmers
Olympic Qualifying Time – 22.01
Olympic Qualifying Time – 22.01	2	Canada	Brent Hayden; Joshua Liendo
Olympic Qualifying Time – 22.01	2	France	Florent Manaudou; Maxime Grousset
Olympic Qualifying Time – 22.01	2	Italy	Alessandro Miressi; Lorenzo Zazzeri
Olympic Qualifying Time – 22.01	2	Netherlands	Thom de Boer; Jesse Puts
Olympic Qualifying Time – 22.01	2	Poland	Konrad Czerniak; Paweł Juraszek
Olympic Qualifying Time – 22.01	2	ROC	Kliment Kolesnikov; Vladimir Morozov
Olympic Qualifying Time – 22.01	2	United States	Michael Andrew; Caeleb Dressel
Olympic Qualifying Time – 22.01	1	Algeria	Oussama Sahnoune
Olympic Qualifying Time – 22.01	1	Australia	Cameron McEvoy
Olympic Qualifying Time – 22.01	1	Brazil	Bruno Fratus
Olympic Qualifying Time – 22.01	1	China	Yu Hexin
Olympic Qualifying Time – 22.01	1	Croatia	Nikola Miljenić
Olympic Qualifying Time – 22.01	1	Egypt	Ali Khalafalla
Olympic Qualifying Time – 22.01	1	Finland	Ari-Pekka Liukkonen
Olympic Qualifying Time – 22.01	1	Great Britain	Ben Proud
Olympic Qualifying Time – 22.01	1	Greece	Kristian Golomeev
Olympic Qualifying Time – 22.01	1	Hong Kong	Ian Ho
Olympic Qualifying Time – 22.01	1	Hungary	Maxim Lobanovskij
Olympic Qualifying Time – 22.01	1	Israel	Meiron Cheruti
Olympic Qualifying Time – 22.01	1	Mexico	Gabriel Castaño
Olympic Qualifying Time – 22.01	1	South Africa	Brad Tandy
Olympic Qualifying Time – 22.01	1	Sweden	Björn Seeliger
Olympic Qualifying Time – 22.01	1	Ukraine	Vladyslav Bukhov
Olympic Qualifying Time – 22.01	1	Venezuela	Alberto Mestre
Olympic Selection Time – 22.67	1	Argentina	Santiago Grassi^{[a]}
Olympic Selection Time – 22.67	1	Austria	Heiko Gigler
Olympic Selection Time – 22.67	1	Bosnia and Herzegovina	Emir Muratović^{[b]}
Olympic Selection Time – 22.67	1	Cayman Islands	Brett Fraser^{[b]}
Olympic Selection Time – 22.67	1	Philippines	Luke Gebbie^{[b]}
Olympic Selection Time – 22.67	1	Romania	David Popovici^{[a]}
Olympic Selection Time – 22.67	1	Serbia	Andrej Barna^{[a]}
Olympic Selection Time – 22.67	1	South Korea	Hwang Sun-woo^{[a]}
Olympic Selection Time – 22.67	1	Suriname	Renzo Tjon-A-Joe^{[b]}
Olympic Selection Time – 22.67	1	Uruguay	Enzo Martínez^{[b]}
Universality Places	1	Afghanistan	Fahim Anwari
Universality Places	1	Armenia	Artur Barseghyan^{[c]}
Universality Places	1	Bangladesh	Mohammed Ariful Islam
Universality Places	1	Benin	Marc Dansou
Universality Places	1	Burkina Faso	Adama Ouedraogo
Universality Places	1	Cambodia	Hem Puch
Universality Places	1	Cameroon	Charly Ndjoume
Universality Places	1	Cape Verde	Troy Pina
Universality Places	1	Cyprus	Nikolas Antoniou^{[c]}
Universality Places	1	Djibouti	Hussein Gabor Ibrahim
Universality Places	1	Timor-Leste	José da Silva Viegas
Universality Places	1	Equatorial Guinea	Diosdado Miko Eyanga
Universality Places	1	Eritrea	Ghirmai Efrem
Universality Places	1	Eswatini	Simanga Dlamini
Universality Places	1	Gabon	Adam Mpali
Universality Places	1	The Gambia	Ebrima Buaro
Universality Places	0	Guinea	Mamadou Bah
Universality Places	1	Laos	Santisouk Inthavong
Universality Places	1	Malawi	Filipe Gomes
Universality Places	1	Marshall Islands	Phillip Kinono
Universality Places	1	Mongolia	Myagmaryn Delgerkhüü
Universality Places	1	Palau	Shawn Dingilius-Wallace
Universality Places	1	Rwanda	Eloi Maniraguha
Universality Places	1	Saint Vincent and the Grenadines	Shane Cadogan
Universality Places	1	Sierra Leone	Joshua Wyse
Universality Places	1	Solomon Islands	Edgar Iro
Universality Places	1	Tajikistan	Olimjon Ishanov
Universality Places	1	Togo	Mawupemon Otogbe
Universality Places	1	Zambia	Shaquille Moosa
Invitational Places	1	Refugee Olympic Team	Alaa Maso
Total	67		

==== Men's 100 m freestyle ====
Qualification standard	No. of athletes	NOC	Qualified swimmers
Olympic Qualifying Time – 48.57	2	Australia	Kyle Chalmers; Cameron McEvoy
Olympic Qualifying Time – 48.57	2	Brazil	Pedro Spajari; Gabriel Santos
Olympic Qualifying Time – 48.57	2	Canada	Yuri Kisil; Joshua Liendo
Olympic Qualifying Time – 48.57	2	France	Maxime Grousset; Mehdy Metella
Olympic Qualifying Time – 48.57	2	Great Britain	Matthew Richards; Jacob Whittle
Olympic Qualifying Time – 48.57	2	Hungary	Nándor Németh; Szebasztián Szabó
Olympic Qualifying Time – 48.57	2	Italy	Thomas Ceccon; Alessandro Miressi
Olympic Qualifying Time – 48.57	2	ROC	Kliment Kolesnikov; Andrey Minakov
Olympic Qualifying Time – 48.57	2	United States	Zach Apple; Caeleb Dressel
Olympic Qualifying Time – 48.57	1	Algeria	Oussama Sahnoune
Olympic Qualifying Time – 48.57	1	China	He Junyi
Olympic Qualifying Time – 48.57	1	Germany	Damian Wierling
Olympic Qualifying Time – 48.57	1	Greece	Apostolos Christou
Olympic Qualifying Time – 48.57	1	Japan	Katsumi Nakamura
Olympic Qualifying Time – 48.57	1	Netherlands	Stan Pijnenburg
Olympic Qualifying Time – 48.57	1	Romania	David Popovici
Olympic Qualifying Time – 48.57	1	Serbia	Andrej Barna
Olympic Qualifying Time – 48.57	1	South Korea	Hwang Sun-woo
Olympic Qualifying Time – 48.57	1	Switzerland	Roman Mityukov
Olympic Qualifying Time – 48.57	1	Trinidad and Tobago	Dylan Carter
Olympic Qualifying Time – 48.57	1	Ukraine	Sergii Shevtsov
Olympic Selection Time – 50.03	1	Armenia	Artur Barseghyan^{[b]}
Olympic Selection Time – 50.03	1	Aruba	Mikel Schreuders^{[b]}
Olympic Selection Time – 50.03	1	Bosnia and Herzegovina	Emir Muratović^{[b]}
Olympic Selection Time – 50.03	1	Bulgaria	Josif Miladinov^{[a]}
Olympic Selection Time – 50.03	1	Croatia	Nikola Miljenić^{[a]}
Olympic Selection Time – 50.03	1	Cyprus	Nikolas Antoniou^{[b]}
Olympic Selection Time – 50.03	1	Finland	Ari-Pekka Liukkonen^{[a]}
Olympic Selection Time – 50.03	1	Hong Kong	Ian Ho^{[a]}
Olympic Selection Time – 50.03	1	Israel	Meiron Cheruti^{[a]}
Olympic Selection Time – 50.03	1	Paraguay	Ben Hockin^{[b]}
Olympic Selection Time – 50.03	1	Philippines	Luke Gebbie^{[b]}
Olympic Selection Time – 50.03	1	Singapore	Joseph Schooling^{[a]}
Olympic Selection Time – 50.03	1	Suriname	Renzo Tjon-A-Joe^{[b]}
Olympic Selection Time – 50.03	1	Venezuela	Alberto Mestre^{[a]}
Universality Places	1	Albania	Kledi Kadiu
Universality Places	1	Antigua and Barbuda	Stefano Mitchell
Universality Places	1	Bhutan	Sangay Tenzin
Universality Places	1	Burundi	Belly-Cresus Ganira
Universality Places	1	Grenada	Delron Felix
Universality Places	1	Guam	Jagger Stephens
Universality Places	1	Guyana	Andrew Fowler
Universality Places	1	Kenya	Danilo Rosafio
Universality Places	1	Kosovo	Olt Kondirolli
Universality Places	1	Maldives	Mubal Ibrahim
Universality Places	1	Malta	Andrew Chetcuti
Universality Places	1	Mauritius	Mathieu Marquet
Universality Places	1	Montenegro	Boško Radulović
Universality Places	1	Morocco	Samy Boutouil
Universality Places	1	Nepal	Alexander Shah
Universality Places	1	Nicaragua	Miguel Mena
Universality Places	1	Niger	Alassane Seydou
Universality Places	1	Oman	Issa Al-Adawi
Universality Places	1	Pakistan	Muhammad Haseeb Tariq
Universality Places	1	Palestine	Yazan Al-Bawwab
Universality Places	1	Saint Lucia	Jean-Luc Zephir
Universality Places	1	Solomon Islands	Edgar Iro
Universality Places	1	Sri Lanka	Matthew Abeysinghe
Universality Places	1	Uganda	Atuhaire Ambala
Universality Places	1	United Arab Emirates	Yousuf Al-Matrooshi
Universality Places	1	Uzbekistan	Khurshidjon Tursunov
Universality Places	1	Yemen	Mokhtar Al-Yamani^{[c]}
Universality Places	1	Zimbabwe	Peter Wetzlar
Total	72		

==== Men's 200 m freestyle ====
Qualification standard	No. of athletes	NOC	Qualified swimmers
Olympic Qualifying Time – 1:47.02	2	Australia	Thomas Neill; Elijah Winnington
Olympic Qualifying Time – 1:47.02	2	Brazil	Murilo Sartori; Fernando Scheffer
Olympic Qualifying Time – 1:47.02	2	China	Ji Xinjie; Wang Shun
Olympic Qualifying Time – 1:47.02	2	France	Jonathan Atsu; Jordan Pothain
Olympic Qualifying Time – 1:47.02	2	Germany	Jacob Heidtmann; Lukas Märtens
Olympic Qualifying Time – 1:47.02	2	Great Britain	Tom Dean; Duncan Scott
Olympic Qualifying Time – 1:47.02	2	Hungary	Dominik Kozma; Nándor Németh
Olympic Qualifying Time – 1:47.02	2	Italy	Stefano Ballo; Stefano Di Cola
Olympic Qualifying Time – 1:47.02	2	ROC	Ivan Girev; Martin Malyutin
Olympic Qualifying Time – 1:47.02	2	United States	Townley Haas; Kieran Smith
Olympic Qualifying Time – 1:47.02	1	Austria	Felix Auböck
Olympic Qualifying Time – 1:47.02	1	Estonia	Kregor Zirk
Olympic Qualifying Time – 1:47.02	1	Israel	Denis Loktev
Olympic Qualifying Time – 1:47.02	1	Japan	Katsuhiro Matsumoto
Olympic Qualifying Time – 1:47.02	1	Lithuania	Danas Rapšys
Olympic Qualifying Time – 1:47.02	1	Serbia	Velimir Stjepanović
Olympic Qualifying Time – 1:47.02	1	South Korea	Hwang Sun-woo
Olympic Qualifying Time – 1:47.02	1	Sweden	Robin Hanson
Olympic Qualifying Time – 1:47.02	1	Switzerland	Antonio Djakovic
Olympic Selection Time – 1:50.23	1	Aruba	Mikel Schreuders^{[b]}
Olympic Selection Time – 1:50.23	1	Barbados	Alex Sobers^{[b]}
Olympic Selection Time – 1:50.23	1	Cook Islands	Wesley Roberts^{[b]}
Olympic Selection Time – 1:50.23	1	Greece	Dimitrios Markos^{[a]}
Olympic Selection Time – 1:50.23	1	India	Sajan Prakash^{[a]}
Olympic Selection Time – 1:50.23	1	Malaysia	Welson Sim^{[b]}
Olympic Selection Time – 1:50.23	1	Moldova	Alexei Sancov^{[b]}
Olympic Selection Time – 1:50.23	1	Peru	Joaquín Vargas^{[b]}
Olympic Selection Time – 1:50.23	1	Romania	David Popovici^{[a]}
Olympic Selection Time – 1:50.23	1	Turkey	Baturalp Ünlü
Olympic Selection Time – 1:50.23	1	Yemen	Mokhtar Al-Yamani^{[b]}
Universality Places	1	Botswana	James Freeman^{[c]}
Universality Places	1	Libya	Audai Hassouna
Total	44		

==== Men's 400 m freestyle ====
Qualification standard	No. of athletes	NOC	Qualified swimmers
Olympic Qualifying Time – 3:46.78	2	Australia	Jack McLoughlin; Elijah Winnington
Olympic Qualifying Time – 3:46.78	2	Germany	Lukas Märtens; Henning Mühlleitner
Olympic Qualifying Time – 3:46.78	2	Italy	Marco De Tullio; Gabriele Detti
Olympic Qualifying Time – 3:46.78	2	ROC	Martin Malyutin; Aleksandr Yegorov
Olympic Qualifying Time – 3:46.78	2	United States	Jake Mitchell; Kieran Smith
Olympic Qualifying Time – 3:46.78	1	Austria	Felix Auböck
Olympic Qualifying Time – 3:46.78	1	Brazil	Guilherme Costa
Olympic Qualifying Time – 3:46.78	1	China	Ji Xinjie
Olympic Qualifying Time – 3:46.78	1	Great Britain	Kieran Bird
Olympic Qualifying Time – 3:46.78	1	Hungary	Gábor Zombori
Olympic Qualifying Time – 3:46.78	1	Lithuania	Danas Rapšys
Olympic Qualifying Time – 3:46.78	1	Switzerland	Antonio Djakovic
Olympic Qualifying Time – 3:46.78	1	Tunisia	Ahmed Hafnaoui
Olympic Selection Time – 3:53.58	1	Barbados	Alex Sobers^{[b]}
Olympic Selection Time – 3:53.58	1	Botswana	James Freeman^{[b]}
Olympic Selection Time – 3:53.58	1	Cook Islands	Wesley Roberts^{[b]}
Olympic Selection Time – 3:53.58	1	Estonia	Kregor Zirk^{[a]}
Olympic Selection Time – 3:53.58	1	France	David Aubry^{[a]}
Olympic Selection Time – 3:53.58	1	Greece	Konstantinos Englezakis^{[a]}
Olympic Selection Time – 3:53.58	1	Indonesia	Aflah Fadlan Prawira^{[b]}
Olympic Selection Time – 3:53.58	1	Israel	Denis Loktev^{[a]}
Olympic Selection Time – 3:53.58	1	Malaysia	Welson Sim^{[b]}
Olympic Selection Time – 3:53.58	1	New Zealand	Zac Reid^{[a]}
Olympic Selection Time – 3:53.58	1	Norway	Henrik Christiansen^{[a]}
Olympic Selection Time – 3:53.58	1	Peru	Joaquín Vargas^{[b]}
Olympic Selection Time – 3:53.58	1	Slovenia	Martin Bau^{[b]}
Olympic Selection Time – 3:53.58	1	South Korea	Lee Ho-joon
Olympic Selection Time – 3:53.58	1	Venezuela	Alfonso Mestre^{[a]}
Universality Places	1	Chile	Eduardo Cisternas
Universality Places	1	Georgia	Irakli Revishvili
Universality Places	1	Mozambique	Igor Mogne
Universality Places	1	North Macedonia	Filip Derkoski
Total	36		

==== Men's 800 m freestyle ====
Qualification standard	No. of athletes	NOC	Qualified swimmers
Olympic Qualifying Time – 7:54.31	2	Denmark	Anton Ørskov Ipsen; Alexander Nørgaard
Olympic Qualifying Time – 7:54.31	2	Greece	Dimitrios Markos; Konstantinos Englezakis
Olympic Qualifying Time – 7:54.31	2	Italy	Gabriele Detti; Gregorio Paltrinieri
Olympic Qualifying Time – 7:54.31	2	ROC	Ilya Druzhinin; Aleksandr Yegorov
Olympic Qualifying Time – 7:54.31	2	Ukraine	Serhiy Frolov; Mykhailo Romanchuk
Olympic Qualifying Time – 7:54.31	2	United States	Michael Brinegar; Bobby Finke
Olympic Qualifying Time – 7:54.31	1	Australia	Jack McLoughlin
Olympic Qualifying Time – 7:54.31	1	Austria	Felix Auböck
Olympic Qualifying Time – 7:54.31	1	Brazil	Guilherme Costa
Olympic Qualifying Time – 7:54.31	1	China	Cheng Long
Olympic Qualifying Time – 7:54.31	1	Czech Republic	Jan Micka
Olympic Qualifying Time – 7:54.31	1	Egypt	Marwan El-Kamash
Olympic Qualifying Time – 7:54.31	1	France	David Aubry
Olympic Qualifying Time – 7:54.31	1	Germany	Florian Wellbrock
Olympic Qualifying Time – 7:54.31	1	Great Britain	Kieran Bird
Olympic Qualifying Time – 7:54.31	1	Ireland	Daniel Wiffen
Olympic Qualifying Time – 7:54.31	1	New Zealand	Zac Reid
Olympic Qualifying Time – 7:54.31	1	Norway	Henrik Christiansen
Olympic Qualifying Time – 7:54.31	1	Portugal	José Paulo Lopes
Olympic Qualifying Time – 7:54.31	1	Serbia	Vuk Čelić
Olympic Qualifying Time – 7:54.31	1	Tunisia	Ahmed Hafnaoui
Olympic Qualifying Time – 7:54.31	1	Turkey	Yiğit Aslan
Olympic Qualifying Time – 7:54.31	1	Venezuela	Alfonso Mestre
Olympic Qualifying Time – 7:54.31	1	Vietnam	Nguyễn Huy Hoàng
Olympic Selection Time – 8:08.54	1	El Salvador	Marcelo Acosta^{[b]}
Olympic Selection Time – 8:08.54	1	Hungary	Ákos Kalmár^{[a]}
Olympic Selection Time – 8:08.54	1	Slovenia	Martin Bau^{[b]}
Olympic Selection Time – 8:08.54	1	Sweden	Victor Johansson
Total	34		

==== Men's 1500 m freestyle ====
Qualification standard	No. of athletes	NOC	Qualified swimmers
Olympic Qualifying Time – 15:00.99
Olympic Qualifying Time – 15:00.99	2	Australia	Jack McLoughlin; Thomas Neill
Olympic Qualifying Time – 15:00.99	2	Denmark	Anton Ørskov Ipsen; Alexander Nørgaard
Olympic Qualifying Time – 15:00.99	2	Germany	Lukas Märtens; Florian Wellbrock
Olympic Qualifying Time – 15:00.99	2	Hungary	Gergely Gyurta; Ákos Kalmár
Olympic Qualifying Time – 15:00.99	2	Italy	Domenico Acerenza; Gregorio Paltrinieri
Olympic Qualifying Time – 15:00.99	2	ROC	Kirill Martynychev; Aleksandr Yegorov
Olympic Qualifying Time – 15:00.99	2	Ukraine	Serhiy Frolov; Mykhailo Romanchuk
Olympic Qualifying Time – 15:00.99	2	United States	Michael Brinegar; Bobby Finke
Olympic Qualifying Time – 15:00.99	1	Brazil	Guilherme Costa
Olympic Qualifying Time – 15:00.99	1	Czech Republic	Jan Micka
Olympic Qualifying Time – 15:00.99	1	Great Britain	Daniel Jervis
Olympic Qualifying Time – 15:00.99	1	Norway	Henrik Christiansen
Olympic Qualifying Time – 15:00.99	1	Vietnam	Nguyễn Huy Hoàng
Olympic Selection Time – 15:28.02	1	Austria	Felix Auböck^{[a]}
Olympic Selection Time – 15:28.02	1	China	Cheng Long^{[a]}
Olympic Selection Time – 15:28.02	1	El Salvador	Marcelo Acosta^{[b]}
Olympic Selection Time – 15:28.02	1	Indonesia	Aflah Fadlan Prawira^{[b]}
Olympic Selection Time – 15:28.02	1	Ireland	Daniel Wiffen^{[a]}
Olympic Selection Time – 15:28.02	1	Sweden	Victor Johansson
Universality Places	1	Monaco	Theo Druenne
Total	29		

==== Men's 100 m backstroke ====
Qualification standard	No. of athletes	NOC	Qualified swimmers
Olympic Qualifying Time – 53.85	2	Australia	Isaac Cooper; Mitch Larkin
Olympic Qualifying Time – 53.85	2	Brazil	Guilherme Basseto; Guilherme Guido
Olympic Qualifying Time – 53.85	2	Canada	Cole Pratt; Markus Thormeyer
Olympic Qualifying Time – 53.85	2	France	Yohann Ndoye-Brouard; Mewen Tomac
Olympic Qualifying Time – 53.85	2	Germany	Ole Braunschweig; Marek Ulrich
Olympic Qualifying Time – 53.85	2	Great Britain	Luke Greenbank; Joe Litchfield
Olympic Qualifying Time – 53.85	2	Hungary	Richárd Bohus; Ádám Telegdy
Olympic Qualifying Time – 53.85	2	Israel	Michael Laitarovsky; Yakov Toumarkin
Olympic Qualifying Time – 53.85	2	Italy	Thomas Ceccon; Simone Sabbioni
Olympic Qualifying Time – 53.85	2	Romania	Robert Glință; Daniel Martin
Olympic Qualifying Time – 53.85	2	ROC	Kliment Kolesnikov; Evgeny Rylov
Olympic Qualifying Time – 53.85	2	United States	Hunter Armstrong; Ryan Murphy
Olympic Qualifying Time – 53.85	1	Austria	Bernhard Reitshammer
Olympic Qualifying Time – 53.85	1	Belarus	Mikita Tsmyh
Olympic Qualifying Time – 53.85	1	China	Xu Jiayu
Olympic Qualifying Time – 53.85	1	Greece	Apostolos Christou
Olympic Qualifying Time – 53.85	1	India	Srihari Nataraj
Olympic Qualifying Time – 53.85	1	Ireland	Shane Ryan
Olympic Qualifying Time – 53.85	1	Japan	Ryosuke Irie
Olympic Qualifying Time – 53.85	1	Singapore	Quah Zheng Wen
Olympic Qualifying Time – 53.85	1	South Africa	Pieter Coetze
Olympic Qualifying Time – 53.85	1	South Korea	Lee Ju-ho
Olympic Qualifying Time – 53.85	1	Spain	Hugo González
Olympic Selection Time – 55.47	1	Bulgaria	Kaloyan Levterov^{[a]}
Olympic Selection Time – 55.47	1	Czech Republic	Jan Čejka^{[a]}
Olympic Selection Time – 55.47	1	Poland	Kacper Stokowski
Olympic Selection Time – 55.47	1	Portugal	Francisco Santos^{[a]}
Olympic Selection Time – 55.47	1	Trinidad and Tobago	Dylan Carter^{[a]}
Olympic Selection Time – 55.47	1	Turkmenistan	Merdan Ataýew^{[b]}
Universality Places	1	Bolivia	Gabriel Castillo
Universality Places	1	Madagascar	Heriniavo Rasolonjatovo
Total	41		

==== Men's 200 m backstroke ====
Qualification standard	No. of athletes	NOC	Qualified swimmers
Olympic Qualifying Time – 1:57.50	2	France	Yohann Ndoye-Brouard; Mewen Tomac
Olympic Qualifying Time – 1:57.50	2	Great Britain	Luke Greenbank; Brodie Williams
Olympic Qualifying Time – 1:57.50	2	Japan	Ryosuke Irie; Keita Sunama
Olympic Qualifying Time – 1:57.50	2	Poland	Radosław Kawęcki; Jakub Skierka
Olympic Qualifying Time – 1:57.50	2	ROC	Evgeny Rylov; Grigory Tarasevich
Olympic Qualifying Time – 1:57.50	2	United States	Bryce Mefford; Ryan Murphy
Olympic Qualifying Time – 1:57.50	1	Australia	Tristan Hollard
Olympic Qualifying Time – 1:57.50	1	Bulgaria	Kaloyan Levterov
Olympic Qualifying Time – 1:57.50	1	Canada	Markus Thormeyer
Olympic Qualifying Time – 1:57.50	1	China	Xu Jiayu
Olympic Qualifying Time – 1:57.50	1	Czech Republic	Jan Čejka
Olympic Qualifying Time – 1:57.50	1	Germany	Christian Diener
Olympic Qualifying Time – 1:57.50	1	Hungary	Ádám Telegdy
Olympic Qualifying Time – 1:57.50	1	Italy	Matteo Restivo
Olympic Qualifying Time – 1:57.50	1	Portugal	Francisco Santos
Olympic Qualifying Time – 1:57.50	1	South Korea	Lee Ju-ho
Olympic Qualifying Time – 1:57.50	1	Spain	Nicolás García
Olympic Qualifying Time – 1:57.50	1	Switzerland	Roman Mityukov
Olympic Qualifying Time – 1:57.50	1	Turkey	Berke Saka
Olympic Selection Time – 2:01.03	1	Israel	Yakov Toumarkin^{[a]}
Olympic Selection Time – 2:01.03	1	Romania	Robert Glință^{[a]}
Olympic Selection Time – 2:01.03	1	South Africa	Martin Binedell
Universality Places	1	Turkmenistan	Merdan Ataýew^{[c]}
Total	29		

==== Men's 100 m breaststroke ====
Qualification standard	No. of athletes	NOC	Qualified swimmers
Olympic Qualifying Time – 59.93	2	Australia	Zac Stubblety-Cook; Matthew Wilson
Olympic Qualifying Time – 59.93	2	Brazil	Felipe Lima; Caio Pumputis
Olympic Qualifying Time – 59.93	2	Great Britain	Adam Peaty; James Wilby
Olympic Qualifying Time – 59.93	2	Germany	Lucas Matzerath; Fabian Schwingenschlögl
Olympic Qualifying Time – 59.93	2	Italy	Nicolò Martinenghi; Federico Poggio
Olympic Qualifying Time – 59.93	2	Japan	Ryuya Mura; Shoma Sato
Olympic Qualifying Time – 59.93	2	Lithuania	Andrius Šidlauskas; Giedrius Titenis
Olympic Qualifying Time – 59.93	2	Netherlands	Caspar Corbeau; Arno Kamminga
Olympic Qualifying Time – 59.93	2	ROC	Anton Chupkov; Kirill Prigoda
Olympic Qualifying Time – 59.93	2	Turkey	Berkay Ömer Öğretir; Hüseyin Emre Sakçı
Olympic Qualifying Time – 59.93	2	United States	Michael Andrew; Andrew Wilson
Olympic Qualifying Time – 59.93	1	Austria	Bernhard Reitshammer
Olympic Qualifying Time – 59.93	1	Belarus	Ilya Shymanovich
Olympic Qualifying Time – 59.93	1	China	Yan Zibei
Olympic Qualifying Time – 59.93	1	Denmark	Tobias Bjerg
Olympic Qualifying Time – 59.93	1	France	Théo Bussière
Olympic Qualifying Time – 59.93	1	Ireland	Darragh Greene
Olympic Qualifying Time – 59.93	1	Kazakhstan	Dmitriy Balandin
Olympic Qualifying Time – 59.93	1	Kyrgyzstan	Denis Petrashov
Olympic Qualifying Time – 59.93	1	Serbia	Čaba Silađi
Olympic Qualifying Time – 59.93	1	South Africa	Michael Houlie
Olympic Qualifying Time – 59.93	1	South Korea	Cho Sung-jae
Olympic Selection Time – 1:01.73	1	Bahamas	Izaak Bastian^{[b]}
Olympic Selection Time – 1:01.73	1	Bulgaria	Lyubomir Epitropov^{[a]}
Olympic Selection Time – 1:01.73	1	Canada	Gabe Mastromatteo
Olympic Selection Time – 1:01.73	1	Colombia	Jorge Murillo^{[b]}
Olympic Selection Time – 1:01.73	1	Dominican Republic	Josué Domínguez^{[b]}
Olympic Selection Time – 1:01.73	1	Finland	Matti Mattsson^{[a]}
Olympic Selection Time – 1:01.73	1	Honduras	Julio Horrego^{[b]}
Olympic Selection Time – 1:01.73	1	Norway	André Grindheim
Olympic Selection Time – 1:01.73	1	Sweden	Erik Persson^{[a]}
Olympic Selection Time – 1:01.73	1	Switzerland	Jérémy Desplanches^{[a]}
Universality Places	1	American Samoa	Micah Masei
Universality Places	1	Brunei	Muhammad Isa Ahmad
Universality Places	1	Jordan	Amro Al-Wir^{[c]}
Universality Places	1	Mali	Sebastien Kouma
Universality Places	1	Sudan	Abobakr Abass
Universality Places	1	Tonga	Amini Fonua
Universality Places	1	Virgin Islands	Adriel Sanes^{[c]}
Total	50		

==== Men's 200 m breaststroke ====
Qualification standard	No. of athletes	NOC	Qualified swimmers
Olympic Qualifying Time – 2:10.35	2	Australia	Zac Stubblety-Cook; Matthew Wilson
Olympic Qualifying Time – 2:10.35	2	Great Britain	Ross Murdoch; James Wilby
Olympic Qualifying Time – 2:10.35	2	Japan	Ryuya Mura; Shoma Sato
Olympic Qualifying Time – 2:10.35	2	Netherlands	Caspar Corbeau; Arno Kamminga
Olympic Qualifying Time – 2:10.35	2	ROC	Anton Chupkov; Kirill Prigoda
Olympic Qualifying Time – 2:10.35	2	United States	Nic Fink; Andrew Wilson
Olympic Qualifying Time – 2:10.35	1	Austria	Christopher Rothbauer
Olympic Qualifying Time – 2:10.35	1	Bulgaria	Lyubomir Epitropov
Olympic Qualifying Time – 2:10.35	1	China	Qin Haiyang
Olympic Qualifying Time – 2:10.35	1	Finland	Matti Mattsson
Olympic Qualifying Time – 2:10.35	1	France	Antoine Viquerat
Olympic Qualifying Time – 2:10.35	1	Germany	Marco Koch
Olympic Qualifying Time – 2:10.35	1	Iceland	Anton Sveinn McKee
Olympic Qualifying Time – 2:10.35	1	Ireland	Darragh Greene
Olympic Qualifying Time – 2:10.35	1	Kazakhstan	Dmitriy Balandin
Olympic Qualifying Time – 2:10.35	1	Lithuania	Andrius Šidlauskas
Olympic Qualifying Time – 2:10.35	1	South Korea	Cho Sung-jae
Olympic Qualifying Time – 2:10.35	1	Sweden	Erik Persson
Olympic Qualifying Time – 2:10.35	1	Turkey	Berkay Ömer Öğretir
Olympic Selection Time – 2:14.26	1	Colombia	Jorge Murillo^{[b]}
Olympic Selection Time – 2:14.26	1	Estonia	Martin Allikvee
Olympic Selection Time – 2:14.26	1	Israel	Ron Polonsky^{[a]}
Olympic Selection Time – 2:14.26	1	Jordan	Amro Al-Wir^{[b]}
Olympic Selection Time – 2:14.26	1	Kyrgyzstan	Denis Petrashov^{[a]}
Olympic Selection Time – 2:14.26	1	Virgin Islands	Adriel Sanes^{[b]}
Universality Places	1	Bahamas	Izaak Bastian^{[c]}
Universality Places	1	Costa Rica	Arnoldo Herrera
Universality Places	1	Dominican Republic	Josué Domínguez^{[c]}
Universality Places	1	Fiji	Taichi Vakasama
Universality Places	1	Honduras	Julio Horrego^{[c]}
Universality Places	1	Latvia	Daniils Bobrovs
Universality Places	1	Panama	Tyler Christianson^{[c]}
Universality Places	1	Papua New Guinea	Ryan Maskelyne
Universality Places	1	Qatar	Abdulaziz Al-Obaidly
Total	39		

==== Men's 100 m butterfly ====
Qualification standard	No. of athletes	NOC	Qualified swimmers
Olympic Qualifying Time – 51.96	2	Australia	David Morgan; Matthew Temple
Olympic Qualifying Time – 51.96	2	Brazil	Matheus Gonche; Vinicius Lanza
Olympic Qualifying Time – 51.96	2	Bulgaria	Antani Ivanov; Josif Miladinov
Olympic Qualifying Time – 51.96	2	Great Britain	James Guy; Jacob Peters
Olympic Qualifying Time – 51.96	2	Hungary	Kristóf Milák; Szebasztián Szabó
Olympic Qualifying Time – 51.96	2	Israel	Tomer Frankel; Gal Cohen Groumi
Olympic Qualifying Time – 51.96	2	Italy	Federico Burdisso; Santo Condorelli
Olympic Qualifying Time – 51.96	2	Japan	Takeshi Kawamoto; Naoki Mizunuma
Olympic Qualifying Time – 51.96	2	Poland	Paweł Korzeniowski; Jakub Majerski
Olympic Qualifying Time – 51.96	2	ROC	Andrey Minakov; Mikhail Vekovishchev
Olympic Qualifying Time – 51.96	2	Singapore	Quah Zheng Wen; Joseph Schooling
Olympic Qualifying Time – 51.96	2	South Africa	Chad le Clos; Matthew Sates
Olympic Qualifying Time – 51.96	2	United States	Caeleb Dressel; Tom Shields
Olympic Qualifying Time – 51.96	1	Argentina	Santiago Grassi
Olympic Qualifying Time – 51.96	1	Austria	Simon Bucher
Olympic Qualifying Time – 51.96	1	Belarus	Yauhen Tsurkin
Olympic Qualifying Time – 51.96	1	Canada	Joshua Liendo
Olympic Qualifying Time – 51.96	1	China	Sun Jiajun
Olympic Qualifying Time – 51.96	1	Czech Republic	Jan Šefl
Olympic Qualifying Time – 51.96	1	Egypt	Youssef Ramadan
Olympic Qualifying Time – 51.96	1	France	Mehdy Metella
Olympic Qualifying Time – 51.96	1	Germany	Marius Kusch
Olympic Qualifying Time – 51.96	1	Guatemala	Luis Martínez
Olympic Qualifying Time – 51.96	1	Netherlands	Nyls Korstanje
Olympic Qualifying Time – 51.96	1	Switzerland	Noè Ponti
Olympic Qualifying Time – 51.96	1	Turkey	Ümitcan Güreş
Olympic Selection Time – 53.52	1	Belgium	Louis Croenen^{[a]}
Olympic Selection Time – 53.52	1	Croatia	Nikola Miljenić^{[a]}
Olympic Selection Time – 53.52	1	Estonia	Kregor Zirk^{[a]}
Olympic Selection Time – 53.52	1	India	Sajan Prakash^{[a]}
Olympic Selection Time – 53.52	1	Ireland	Shane Ryan^{[a]}
Olympic Selection Time – 53.52	1	Kuwait	Abbas Qali^{[b]}
Olympic Selection Time – 53.52	1	Norway	Tomoe Zenimoto Hvas^{[a]}
Olympic Selection Time – 53.52	1	Paraguay	Ben Hockin^{[b]}
Olympic Selection Time – 53.52	1	Romania	Daniel Martin^{[a]}
Olympic Selection Time – 53.52	1	South Korea	Moon Seung-woo^{[a]}
Olympic Selection Time – 53.52	1	Chinese Taipei	Wang Kuan-hung^{[a]}
Olympic Selection Time – 53.52	1	Trinidad and Tobago	Dylan Carter^{[a]}
Olympic Selection Time – 53.52	1	Ukraine	Ihor Troianovskyi^{[a]}
Universality Places	1	Angola	Salvador Gordo
Universality Places	1	Bahrain	Abdulla Ahmed
Universality Places	1	Ghana	Abeku Jackson
Universality Places	1	Haiti	Davidson Vincent
Universality Places	1	Saudi Arabia	Yousif Bu Arish
Universality Places	1	Senegal	Steven Aimable
Universality Places	1	Thailand	Navaphat Wongcharoen^{[c]}
Total	59		

==== Men's 200 m butterfly ====
Qualification standard	No. of athletes	NOC	Qualified swimmers
Olympic Qualifying Time – 1:56.48	2	Australia	David Morgan; Matthew Temple
Olympic Qualifying Time – 1:56.48	2	Hungary	Tamás Kenderesi; Kristóf Milák
Olympic Qualifying Time – 1:56.48	2	Italy	Federico Burdisso; Giacomo Carini
Olympic Qualifying Time – 1:56.48	2	Japan	Tomoru Honda; Daiya Seto
Olympic Qualifying Time – 1:56.48	2	Poland	Krzysztof Chmielewski; Jakub Majerski
Olympic Qualifying Time – 1:56.48	2	South Africa	Ethan du Preez; Chad le Clos
Olympic Qualifying Time – 1:56.48	2	Ukraine	Denys Kesil; Ihor Troianovskyi
Olympic Qualifying Time – 1:56.48	2	United States	Gunnar Bentz; Zach Harting
Olympic Qualifying Time – 1:56.48	1	Belgium	Louis Croenen
Olympic Qualifying Time – 1:56.48	1	Brazil	Leonardo de Deus
Olympic Qualifying Time – 1:56.48	1	Bulgaria	Antani Ivanov
Olympic Qualifying Time – 1:56.48	1	France	Léon Marchand
Olympic Qualifying Time – 1:56.48	1	Germany	David Thomasberger
Olympic Qualifying Time – 1:56.48	1	India	Sajan Prakash
Olympic Qualifying Time – 1:56.48	1	South Korea	Moon Seung-woo
Olympic Qualifying Time – 1:56.48	1	Switzerland	Noè Ponti
Olympic Qualifying Time – 1:56.48	1	Chinese Taipei	Wang Kuan-hung
Olympic Selection Time – 1:59.97	1	Cuba	Luis Vega Torres^{[b]}
Olympic Selection Time – 1:59.97	1	Estonia	Kregor Zirk^{[a]}
Olympic Selection Time – 1:59.97	1	Ireland	Brendan Hyland
Olympic Selection Time – 1:59.97	1	Moldova	Alexei Sancov^{[b]}
Olympic Selection Time – 1:59.97	1	Norway	Tomoe Zenimoto Hvas^{[a]}
Olympic Selection Time – 1:59.97	1	Singapore	Quah Zheng Wen^{[a]}
Olympic Selection Time – 1:59.97	1	Slovakia	Richard Nagy^{[b]}
Olympic Selection Time – 1:59.97	1	Thailand	Navaphat Wongcharoen^{[b]}
Universality Places	1	Iran	Matin Balsini
Universality Places	1	Jamaica	Keanan Dols^{[c]}
Universality Places	1	Seychelles	Simon Bachmann
Universality Places	1	Syria	Ayman Kelzi
Total	37		

==== Men's 200 m individual medley ====
Qualification standard	No. of athletes	NOC	Qualified swimmers
Olympic Qualifying Time – 1:59.67	2	Australia	Mitch Larkin; Brendon Smith
Olympic Qualifying Time – 1:59.67	2	Brazil	Caio Pumputis; Vinicius Lanza
Olympic Qualifying Time – 1:59.67	2	China	Wang Shun; Qin Haiyang
Olympic Qualifying Time – 1:59.67	2	Germany	Jacob Heidtmann; Philip Heintz
Olympic Qualifying Time – 1:59.67	2	Great Britain	Joe Litchfield; Duncan Scott
Olympic Qualifying Time – 1:59.67	2	Greece	Apostolos Papastamos; Andreas Vazaios
Olympic Qualifying Time – 1:59.67	2	Hungary	László Cseh; Hubert Kós
Olympic Qualifying Time – 1:59.67	2	Israel	Gal Cohen Groumi; Ron Polonsky
Olympic Qualifying Time – 1:59.67	2	Japan	Kosuke Hagino; Daiya Seto
Olympic Qualifying Time – 1:59.67	2	Portugal	Gabriel Lópes; Alexis Santos
Olympic Qualifying Time – 1:59.67	2	ROC	~~Ilya Borodin~~; Andrey Zhilkin
Olympic Qualifying Time – 1:59.67	2	United States	Michael Andrew; Chase Kalisz
Olympic Qualifying Time – 1:59.67	1	Austria	Bernhard Reitshammer
Olympic Qualifying Time – 1:59.67	1	Canada	Finlay Knox
Olympic Qualifying Time – 1:59.67	1	France	Léon Marchand
Olympic Qualifying Time – 1:59.67	1	Italy	Alberto Razzetti
Olympic Qualifying Time – 1:59.67	1	Lithuania	Danas Rapšys
Olympic Qualifying Time – 1:59.67	1	Luxembourg	Raphaël Stacchiotti
Olympic Qualifying Time – 1:59.67	1	New Zealand	Lewis Clareburt
Olympic Qualifying Time – 1:59.67	1	Norway	Tomoe Zenimoto Hvas
Olympic Qualifying Time – 1:59.67	1	South Africa	Matthew Sates
Olympic Qualifying Time – 1:59.67	1	Spain	Hugo González
Olympic Qualifying Time – 1:59.67	1	Switzerland	Jérémy Desplanches
Olympic Qualifying Time – 1:59.67	1	Chinese Taipei	Wang Hsing-hao
Olympic Selection Time – 2:03.26	1	Ecuador	Tomas Peribonio^{[b]}
Olympic Selection Time – 2:03.26	1	Jamaica	Keanan Dols^{[b]}
Olympic Selection Time – 2:03.26	1	Liechtenstein	Christoph Meier^{[b]}
Olympic Selection Time – 2:03.26	1	Mexico	José Ángel Martínez
Olympic Selection Time – 2:03.26	1	Netherlands	Arjan Knipping^{[a]}
Olympic Selection Time – 2:03.26	1	Panama	Tyler Christianson^{[b]}
Olympic Selection Time – 2:03.26	1	Puerto Rico	Jarod Arroyo^{[b]}
Universality Places	1	Lebanon	Munzer Kabbara
Universality Places	1	Federated States of Micronesia	Tasi Limtiaco
Total	45		

==== Men's 400 m individual medley ====
Qualification standard	No. of athletes	NOC	Qualified swimmers
Olympic Qualifying Time – 4:15.84	2	Australia	Brendon Smith; Se-Bom Lee
Olympic Qualifying Time – 4:15.84	2	Great Britain	Max Litchfield; Brodie Williams
Olympic Qualifying Time – 4:15.84	2	Hungary	Péter Bernek; Dávid Verrasztó
Olympic Qualifying Time – 4:15.84	2	Italy	Pier Andrea Matteazzi; Alberto Razzetti
Olympic Qualifying Time – 4:15.84	2	Japan	Yuki Ikari; Daiya Seto
Olympic Qualifying Time – 4:15.84	2	ROC	~~Ilya Borodin~~; Maxim Stupin
Olympic Qualifying Time – 4:15.84	2	United States	Chase Kalisz; Jay Litherland
Olympic Qualifying Time – 4:15.84	1	Azerbaijan	Maksym Shemberev
Olympic Qualifying Time – 4:15.84	1	China	Wang Shun
Olympic Qualifying Time – 4:15.84	1	France	Léon Marchand
Olympic Qualifying Time – 4:15.84	1	Germany	Jacob Heidtmann
Olympic Qualifying Time – 4:15.84	1	Greece	Apostolos Papastamos
Olympic Qualifying Time – 4:15.84	1	Netherlands	Arjan Knipping
Olympic Qualifying Time – 4:15.84	1	New Zealand	Lewis Clareburt
Olympic Qualifying Time – 4:15.84	1	Spain	Joan Lluís Pons
Olympic Qualifying Time – 4:15.84	1	Switzerland	Jérémy Desplanches
Olympic Selection Time – 4:21.46	1	Ecuador	Tomas Peribonio^{[b]}
Olympic Selection Time – 4:21.46	1	Israel	Ron Polonsky^{[a]}
Olympic Selection Time – 4:21.46	1	Puerto Rico	Jarod Arroyo^{[b]}
Olympic Selection Time – 4:21.46	1	Portugal	José Paulo Lopes^{[a]}
Olympic Selection Time – 4:21.46	1	Slovakia	Richard Nagy^{[b]}
Olympic Selection Time – 4:21.46	1	Chinese Taipei	Wang Hsing-hao^{[a]}
Universality Places	1	Cuba	Luis Vega Torres^{[c]}
Universality Places	1	Liechtenstein	Christoph Meier^{[c]}
Total	31		

=== Women's individual events ===
==== Women's 50 m freestyle ====
Qualification standard	No. of athletes	NOC	Qualified swimmers
Olympic Qualifying Time – 24.77	2	Australia	Cate Campbell; Emma McKeon
Olympic Qualifying Time – 24.77	2	China	Wu Qingfeng; Zhang Yufei
Olympic Qualifying Time – 24.77	2	Denmark	Pernille Blume; Julie Kepp Jensen
Olympic Qualifying Time – 24.77	2	France	Mélanie Henique; Marie Wattel
Olympic Qualifying Time – 24.77	2	Netherlands	Femke Heemskerk; Ranomi Kromowidjojo
Olympic Qualifying Time – 24.77	2	ROC	Maria Kameneva; Arina Surkova
Olympic Qualifying Time – 24.77	2	Sweden	Michelle Coleman; Sarah Sjöström
Olympic Qualifying Time – 24.77	2	United States	Simone Manuel; Abbey Weitzeil
Olympic Qualifying Time – 24.77	1	Brazil	Etiene Medeiros
Olympic Qualifying Time – 24.77	1	Canada	Kayla Sanchez
Olympic Qualifying Time – 24.77	1	Czech Republic	Barbora Seemanová
Olympic Qualifying Time – 24.77	1	Great Britain	Anna Hopkin
Olympic Qualifying Time – 24.77	1	Hong Kong	Siobhán Haughey
Olympic Qualifying Time – 24.77	1	Poland	Katarzyna Wasick
Olympic Qualifying Time – 24.77	1	South Africa	Emma Chelius
Olympic Selection Time – 25.51	1	Algeria	Amel Melih^{[b]}
Olympic Selection Time – 25.51	1	Colombia	Isabella Arcila^{[b]}
Olympic Selection Time – 25.51	1	Cyprus	Kalia Antoniou^{[b]}
Olympic Selection Time – 25.51	1	Egypt	Farida Osman^{[a]}
Olympic Selection Time – 25.51	1	Ireland	Danielle Hill^{[a]}
Olympic Selection Time – 25.51	1	Israel	Andrea Murez^{[a]}
Olympic Selection Time – 25.51	1	Luxembourg	Julie Meynen
Olympic Selection Time – 25.51	1	Romania	Bianca-Andreea Costea^{[b]}
Olympic Selection Time – 25.51	1	Singapore	Quah Ting Wen^{[b]}
Olympic Selection Time – 25.51	1	Spain	Lidón Muñoz del Campo^{[a]}
Olympic Selection Time – 25.51	1	Thailand	Jenjira Srisa-ard^{[b]}
Olympic Selection Time – 25.51	1	Trinidad and Tobago	Cherelle Thompson^{[b]}
Olympic Selection Time – 25.51	1	Venezuela	Jeserik Pinto^{[b]}
Universality Places	1	Albania	Nikol Merizaj
Universality Places	1	Antigua and Barbuda	Samantha Roberts
Universality Places	1	Aruba	Allyson Ponson
Universality Places	1	Bahrain	Noor Taha
Universality Places	1	Bangladesh	Junayna Ahmed
Universality Places	1	Benin	Nafissath Radji
Universality Places	1	Bolivia	Karen Torrez
Universality Places	1	British Virgin Islands	Elinah Phillip
Universality Places	1	Burundi	Odrina Kaze
Universality Places	1	Burkina Faso	Adama Ouedraogo
Universality Places	1	Cambodia	Bunpichmorakat Kheun
Universality Places	1	Cameroon	Norah Elisabeth Milanesi
Universality Places	1	Central African Republic	Chloe Sauvourel
Universality Places	1	Croatia	Ema Rajić^{[c]}
Universality Places	1	Timor-Leste	Imelda Ximenes
Universality Places	1	Ecuador	Anicka Delgado^{[c]}
Universality Places	1	Equatorial Guinea	Rita Ekomba
Universality Places	1	Eswatini	Robyn Young
Universality Places	1	Gabon	Aya Mpali
Universality Places	1	Guyana	Aleka Persaud
Universality Places	1	Jordan	Talita Baqlah
Universality Places	1	Kuwait	Lara Dashti
Universality Places	1	Laos	Siri Arun Budcharern
Universality Places	1	Malawi	Jessica Makwenda
Universality Places	1	Mongolia	Batbayaryn Enkhkhüslen
Universality Places	1	Mozambique	Alicia Mateus
Universality Places	1	Niger	Roukaya Mahamane
Universality Places	1	Pakistan	Bisma Khan
Universality Places	1	Palau	Osisang Chilton
Universality Places	1	Palestine	Dania Nour
Universality Places	1	Papua New Guinea	Judith Meauri
Universality Places	1	Republic of the Congo	Stefan Sangala
Universality Places	1	Qatar	Nada Arakji
Universality Places	1	Rwanda	Alphonsine Agahozo
Universality Places	1	Saint Lucia	Mikaili Charlemagne
Universality Places	1	Saint Vincent and the Grenadines	Mya de Freitas
Universality Places	1	Sierra Leone	Tity Dumbuya
Universality Places	1	Sudan	Haneen Ibrahim
Universality Places	1	Chinese Taipei	Huang Mei-chien
Universality Places	1	Tajikistan	Anastasiya Tyurina
Universality Places	1	Tonga	Noelani Malia Day
Universality Places	1	Zambia	Tilka Paljk
Total	75		

==== Women's 100 m freestyle ====
Qualification standard	No. of athletes	NOC	Qualified swimmers
Olympic Qualifying Time – 54.38	2	Australia	Cate Campbell; Emma McKeon
Olympic Qualifying Time – 54.38	2	Canada	Penny Oleksiak; Kayla Sanchez
Olympic Qualifying Time – 54.38	2	China	Wu Qingfeng; Yang Junxuan
Olympic Qualifying Time – 54.38	2	Denmark	Pernille Blume; Signe Bro
Olympic Qualifying Time – 54.38	2	France	Charlotte Bonnet; Marie Wattel
Olympic Qualifying Time – 54.38	2	Great Britain	Freya Anderson; Anna Hopkin
Olympic Qualifying Time – 54.38	2	Israel	Anastasia Gorbenko; Andrea Murez
Olympic Qualifying Time – 54.38	2	Netherlands	Femke Heemskerk; Ranomi Kromowidjojo
Olympic Qualifying Time – 54.38	2	Sweden	Michelle Coleman; Sarah Sjöström
Olympic Qualifying Time – 54.38	2	United States	Erika Brown; Abbey Weitzeil
Olympic Qualifying Time – 54.38	1	Belarus	Anastasiya Shkurdai
Olympic Qualifying Time – 54.38	1	Czech Republic	Barbora Seemanová
Olympic Qualifying Time – 54.38	1	Germany	Annika Bruhn
Olympic Qualifying Time – 54.38	1	Hong Kong	Siobhán Haughey
Olympic Qualifying Time – 54.38	1	Italy	Federica Pellegrini
Olympic Qualifying Time – 54.38	1	Poland	Katarzyna Wasick
Olympic Qualifying Time – 54.38	1	ROC	Maria Kameneva
Olympic Qualifying Time – 54.38	1	Slovenia	Janja Šegel
Olympic Qualifying Time – 54.38	1	South Africa	Erin Gallagher
Olympic Qualifying Time – 54.38	1	Spain	Lidón Muñoz del Campo
Olympic Selection Time – 56.01	1	Cyprus	Kalia Antoniou^{[b]}
Olympic Selection Time – 56.01	1	Ecuador	Anicka Delgado^{[b]}
Olympic Selection Time – 56.01	1	Finland	Fanny Teijonsalo^{[a]}
Olympic Selection Time – 56.01	1	Latvia	Ieva Maļuka^{[b]}
Olympic Selection Time – 56.01	1	Luxembourg	Julie Meynen
Olympic Selection Time – 56.01	1	Puerto Rico	Miriam Sheehan^{[b]}
Olympic Selection Time – 56.01	1	Romania	Bianca-Andreea Costea^{[b]}
Olympic Selection Time – 56.01	1	Singapore	Quah Ting Wen^{[b]}
Olympic Selection Time – 56.01	1	Switzerland	Maria Ugolkova^{[a]}
Universality Places	1	Algeria	Amel Melih^{[c]}
Universality Places	1	Angola	Catarina Sousa
Universality Places	1	Armenia	Varsenik Manucharyan
Universality Places	1	Cayman Islands	Jillian Crooks
Universality Places	1	Georgia	Mariam Imnadze
Universality Places	1	Guam	Mineri Gomez
Universality Places	1	Iceland	Snæfríður Jórunnardóttir^{[c]}
Universality Places	1	Marshall Islands	Colleen Furgeson
Universality Places	1	Montenegro	Anđela Antunović
Universality Places	1	Nepal	Gaurika Singh
Universality Places	1	Nicaragua	Maria Victoria Schutmeizer
Universality Places	1	Nigeria	Abiola Ogunbanwo
Universality Places	1	North Macedonia	Mia Eminova
Universality Places	1	Senegal	Jeanne Boutbien
Universality Places	1	Thailand	Jenjira Srisa-ard^{[c]}
Total	53		

==== Women's 200 m freestyle ====
Qualification standard	No. of athletes	NOC	Qualified swimmers
Olympic Qualifying Time – 1:57.28	2	Australia	Ariarne Titmus; Madison Wilson
Olympic Qualifying Time – 1:57.28	2	China	Li Bingjie; Yang Junxuan
Olympic Qualifying Time – 1:57.28	2	Canada	Summer McIntosh; Penny Oleksiak
Olympic Qualifying Time – 1:57.28	2	Germany	Annika Bruhn; Isabel Gose
Olympic Qualifying Time – 1:57.28	2	United States	Katie Ledecky; Allison Schmitt
Olympic Qualifying Time – 1:57.28	1	Czech Republic	Barbora Seemanová
Olympic Qualifying Time – 1:57.28	1	France	Charlotte Bonnet
Olympic Qualifying Time – 1:57.28	1	Great Britain	Freya Anderson
Olympic Qualifying Time – 1:57.28	1	Hong Kong	Siobhán Haughey
Olympic Qualifying Time – 1:57.28	1	Italy	Federica Pellegrini
Olympic Qualifying Time – 1:57.28	1	ROC	Valeriya Salamatina
Olympic Qualifying Time – 1:57.28	1	Sweden	Sarah Sjöström
Olympic Selection Time – 2:00.80	1	Bahamas	Joanna Evans^{[a]}
Olympic Selection Time – 2:00.80	1	Cuba	Elisbet Gámez^{[b]}
Olympic Selection Time – 2:00.80	1	Iceland	Snæfríður Jórunnardóttir^{[b]}
Olympic Selection Time – 2:00.80	1	Israel	Andrea Murez^{[a]}
Olympic Selection Time – 2:00.80	1	Liechtenstein	Julia Hassler^{[b]}
Olympic Selection Time – 2:00.80	1	New Zealand	Erika Fairweather^{[a]}
Olympic Selection Time – 2:00.80	1	Slovenia	Janja Šegel^{[a]}
Olympic Selection Time – 2:00.80	1	Vietnam	Nguyễn Thị Ánh Viên^{[b]}
Universality Places	1	Costa Rica	Beatriz Padron
Universality Places	1	Guatemala	Gabriela Santis
Universality Places	1	Latvia	Ieva Maļuka^{[c]}
Universality Places	1	Lebanon	Gabriella Doueihy
Universality Places	1	Morocco	Lina Khiyara
Total	30		

==== Women's 400 m freestyle ====
Qualification standard	No. of athletes	NOC	Qualified swimmers
Olympic Qualifying Time – 4:07.90	2	Australia	Ariarne Titmus; Tamsin Cook
Olympic Qualifying Time – 4:07.90	2	China	Li Bingjie; Tang Muhan
Olympic Qualifying Time – 4:07.90	2	Germany	Isabel Gose; Leonie Kullmann
Olympic Qualifying Time – 4:07.90	2	Japan	Waka Kobori; Miyu Namba
Olympic Qualifying Time – 4:07.90	2	ROC	Anna Egorova; Anastasiya Kirpichnikova
Olympic Qualifying Time – 4:07.90	2	Turkey	Beril Böcekler; Merve Tuncel
Olympic Qualifying Time – 4:07.90	2	United States	Katie Ledecky; Paige Madden
Olympic Qualifying Time – 4:07.90	1	Argentina	Delfina Pignatiello
Olympic Qualifying Time – 4:07.90	1	Bahamas	Joanna Evans
Olympic Qualifying Time – 4:07.90	1	Canada	Summer McIntosh
Olympic Qualifying Time – 4:07.90	1	Hungary	Ajna Késely
Olympic Qualifying Time – 4:07.90	1	Italy	Simona Quadarella
Olympic Qualifying Time – 4:07.90	1	New Zealand	Erika Fairweather
Olympic Selection Time – 4:15.34	1	Austria	Marlene Kahler^{[a]}
Olympic Selection Time – 4:15.34	1	Cuba	Elisbet Gámez^{[b]}
Olympic Selection Time – 4:15.34	1	Liechtenstein	Julia Hassler^{[b]}
Olympic Selection Time – 4:15.34	1	South Korea	Han Da-kyung^{[a]}
Universality Places	1	Ivory Coast	Talita Te Flan
Universality Places	1	Kosovo	Eda Zeqiri
Universality Places	1	Madagascar	Tiana Rabarijaona
Universality Places	1	Malta	Sasha Gatt^{[c]}
Universality Places	1	Virgin Islands	Natalia Kuipers
Total	29		

==== Women's 800 m freestyle ====
Qualification standard	No. of athletes	NOC	Qualified swimmers
Olympic Qualifying Time – 8:33.36	2	Australia	Ariarne Titmus; Kiah Melverton
Olympic Qualifying Time – 8:33.36	2	China	Li Bingjie; Wang Jianjiahe
Olympic Qualifying Time – 8:33.36	2	Germany	Isabel Gose; Sarah Köhler
Olympic Qualifying Time – 8:33.36	2	Italy	Martina Caramignoli; Simona Quadarella
Olympic Qualifying Time – 8:33.36	2	Japan	Waka Kobori; Miyu Namba
Olympic Qualifying Time – 8:33.36	2	ROC	Anna Egorova; Anastasiya Kirpichnikova
Olympic Qualifying Time – 8:33.36	2	Spain	Mireia Belmonte; Jimena Pérez
Olympic Qualifying Time – 8:33.36	2	Turkey	Deniz Ertan; Merve Tuncel
Olympic Qualifying Time – 8:33.36	2	United States	Katie Grimes; Katie Ledecky
Olympic Qualifying Time – 8:33.36	1	Argentina	Delfina Pignatiello
Olympic Qualifying Time – 8:33.36	1	Austria	Marlene Kahler
Olympic Qualifying Time – 8:33.36	1	Canada	Summer McIntosh
Olympic Qualifying Time – 8:33.36	1	Hungary	Ajna Késely
Olympic Qualifying Time – 8:33.36	1	Liechtenstein	Julia Hassler
Olympic Qualifying Time – 8:33.36	1	Portugal	Tamila Holub
Olympic Selection Time – 8:48.76	1	Brazil	Viviane Jungblut^{[a]}
Olympic Selection Time – 8:48.76	1	Chile	Kristel Köbrich^{[a]}
Olympic Selection Time – 8:48.76	1	New Zealand	Eve Thomas^{[a]}
Olympic Selection Time – 8:48.76	1	Slovenia	Katja Fain^{[a]}
Olympic Selection Time – 8:48.76	1	South Korea	Han Da-kyung^{[a]}
Olympic Selection Time – 8:48.76	1	Vietnam	Nguyễn Thị Ánh Viên^{[b]}
Universality Places	1	Malta	Sasha Gatt^{[c]}
Universality Places	1	San Marino	Arianna Valloni^{[c]}
Total	31		

==== Women's 1500 m freestyle ====
Qualification standard	No. of athletes	NOC	Qualified swimmers
Olympic Qualifying Time – 16:32.04	2	Australia	Maddy Gough; Kiah Melverton
Olympic Qualifying Time – 16:32.04	2	Brazil	Beatriz Dizotti; Viviane Jungblut
Olympic Qualifying Time – 16:32.04	2	China	Li Bingjie; Wang Jianjiahe
Olympic Qualifying Time – 16:32.04	2	Germany	Sarah Köhler; Celine Rieder
Olympic Qualifying Time – 16:32.04	2	Hungary	Ajna Késely; Viktória Mihályvári-Farkas
Olympic Qualifying Time – 16:32.04	2	Italy	Martina Caramignoli; Simona Quadarella
Olympic Qualifying Time – 16:32.04	2	New Zealand	Hayley McIntosh; Eve Thomas
Olympic Qualifying Time – 16:32.04	2	Portugal	Diana Durães; Tamila Holub
Olympic Qualifying Time – 16:32.04	2	Spain	Mireia Belmonte; Jimena Pérez
Olympic Qualifying Time – 16:32.04	2	Turkey	Beril Böcekler; Merve Tuncel
Olympic Qualifying Time – 16:32.04	2	United States	Katie Ledecky; Erica Sullivan
Olympic Qualifying Time – 16:32.04	1	Argentina	Delfina Pignatiello
Olympic Qualifying Time – 16:32.04	1	Austria	Marlene Kahler
Olympic Qualifying Time – 16:32.04	1	Canada	Katrina Bellio
Olympic Qualifying Time – 16:32.04	1	Chile	Kristel Köbrich
Olympic Qualifying Time – 16:32.04	1	Denmark	Helena Rosendahl Bach
Olympic Qualifying Time – 16:32.04	1	Liechtenstein	Julia Hassler
Olympic Qualifying Time – 16:32.04	1	ROC	Anastasiya Kirpichnikova
Olympic Qualifying Time – 16:32.04	1	Slovenia	Katja Fain
Olympic Qualifying Time – 16:32.04	1	South Korea	Han Da-kyung
Olympic Selection Time – 17:01.80	1	San Marino	Arianna Valloni^{[b]}
Total	32		

==== Women's 100 m backstroke ====
Qualification standard	No. of athletes	NOC	Qualified swimmers
Olympic Qualifying Time – 1:00.25	2	Australia	Kaylee McKeown; Emily Seebohm
Olympic Qualifying Time – 1:00.25	2	Canada	Kylie Masse; Taylor Ruck
Olympic Qualifying Time – 1:00.25	2	China	Chen Jie; Peng Xuwei
Olympic Qualifying Time – 1:00.25	2	Great Britain	Kathleen Dawson; Cassie Wild
Olympic Qualifying Time – 1:00.25	2	Netherlands	Kira Toussaint; Maaike de Waard
Olympic Qualifying Time – 1:00.25	2	ROC	Anastasia Fesikova; Maria Kameneva
Olympic Qualifying Time – 1:00.25	2	Sweden	Michelle Coleman; Louise Hansson
Olympic Qualifying Time – 1:00.25	2	United States	Regan Smith; Rhyan White
Olympic Qualifying Time – 1:00.25	1	Belarus	Anastasiya Shkurdai
Olympic Qualifying Time – 1:00.25	1	Czech Republic	Simona Kubová
Olympic Qualifying Time – 1:00.25	1	France	Béryl Gastaldello
Olympic Qualifying Time – 1:00.25	1	Germany	Laura Riedemann
Olympic Qualifying Time – 1:00.25	1	Hong Kong	Stephanie Au
Olympic Qualifying Time – 1:00.25	1	Hungary	Katalin Burián
Olympic Qualifying Time – 1:00.25	1	Ireland	Danielle Hill
Olympic Qualifying Time – 1:00.25	1	Italy	Margherita Panziera
Olympic Qualifying Time – 1:00.25	1	Japan	Anna Konishi
Olympic Qualifying Time – 1:00.25	1	Norway	Ingeborg Løyning
Olympic Qualifying Time – 1:00.25	1	South Korea	Lee Eun-ji
Olympic Selection Time – 1:02.06	1	Austria	Lena Grabowski^{[a]}
Olympic Selection Time – 1:02.06	1	Colombia	Isabella Arcila^{[b]}
Olympic Selection Time – 1:02.06	1	El Salvador	Celina Márquez^{[b]}
Olympic Selection Time – 1:02.06	1	Finland	Mimosa Jallow
Olympic Selection Time – 1:02.06	1	Moldova	Tatiana Salcuțan^{[a]}
Olympic Selection Time – 1:02.06	1	New Zealand	Ali Galyer^{[a]}
Olympic Selection Time – 1:02.06	1	Ukraine	Daryna Zevina^{[a]}
Universality Places	1	Barbados	Danielle Titus
Universality Places	1	Dominican Republic	Krystal Lara^{[c]}
Universality Places	1	Grenada	Kimberly Ince
Universality Places	1	India	Maana Patel
Universality Places	1	Kazakhstan	Diana Nazarova
Universality Places	1	Peru	McKenna DeBever^{[c]}
Universality Places	1	Seychelles	Felicity Passon^{[c]}
Universality Places	1	Zimbabwe	Donata Katai
Total	44		

==== Women's 200 m backstroke ====
Qualification standard	No. of athletes	NOC	Qualified swimmers
Olympic Qualifying Time – 2:10.39	2	Australia	Kaylee McKeown; Emily Seebohm
Olympic Qualifying Time – 2:10.39	2	Canada	Kylie Masse; Taylor Ruck
Olympic Qualifying Time – 2:10.39	2	China	Liu Yaxin; Peng Xuwei
Olympic Qualifying Time – 2:10.39	2	Great Britain	Kathleen Dawson; Cassie Wild
Olympic Qualifying Time – 2:10.39	2	Hungary	Katalin Burián; Katinka Hosszú
Olympic Qualifying Time – 2:10.39	2	Netherlands	Kira Toussaint; Sharon van Rouwendaal
Olympic Qualifying Time – 2:10.39	2	United States	Phoebe Bacon; Rhyan White
Olympic Qualifying Time – 2:10.39	1	Austria	Lena Grabowski
Olympic Qualifying Time – 2:10.39	1	Italy	Margherita Panziera
Olympic Qualifying Time – 2:10.39	1	Moldova	Tatiana Salcuțan
Olympic Qualifying Time – 2:10.39	1	New Zealand	Ali Galyer
Olympic Qualifying Time – 2:10.39	1	Poland	Laura Bernat
Olympic Qualifying Time – 2:10.39	1	ROC	Daria Ustinova
Olympic Qualifying Time – 2:10.39	1	South Korea	Lee Eun-ji
Olympic Qualifying Time – 2:10.39	1	Spain	África Zamorano
Olympic Qualifying Time – 2:10.39	1	Ukraine	Daryna Zevina
Olympic Selection Time – 2:14.30	1	Czech Republic	Simona Kubová^{[a]}
Olympic Selection Time – 2:14.30	1	Dominican Republic	Krystal Lara^{[b]}
Olympic Selection Time – 2:14.30	1	El Salvador	Celina Márquez^{[b]}
Olympic Selection Time – 2:14.30	1	Israel	Aviv Barzelay
Olympic Selection Time – 2:14.30	1	Norway	Ingeborg Løyning^{[b]}
Olympic Selection Time – 2:14.30	1	Seychelles	Felicity Passon^{[b]}
Total	30		

==== Women's 100 m breaststroke ====
Qualification standard	No. of athletes	NOC	Qualified swimmers
Olympic Qualifying Time – 1:07.07	2	Australia	Jessica Hansen; Chelsea Hodges
Olympic Qualifying Time – 1:07.07	2	Canada	Kierra Smith; Kelsey Wog
Olympic Qualifying Time – 1:07.07	2	Great Britain	Molly Renshaw; Sarah Vasey
Olympic Qualifying Time – 1:07.07	2	Italy	Martina Carraro; Benedetta Pilato
Olympic Qualifying Time – 1:07.07	2	Japan	Reona Aoki; Kanako Watanabe
Olympic Qualifying Time – 1:07.07	2	ROC	Evgenia Chikunova; Yuliya Yefimova
Olympic Qualifying Time – 1:07.07	2	Sweden	Emelie Fast; Sophie Hansson
Olympic Qualifying Time – 1:07.07	2	United States	Lydia Jacoby; Lilly King
Olympic Qualifying Time – 1:07.07	1	Argentina	Julia Sebastián
Olympic Qualifying Time – 1:07.07	1	Belarus	Alina Zmushka
Olympic Qualifying Time – 1:07.07	1	Belgium	Fanny Lecluyse
Olympic Qualifying Time – 1:07.07	1	China	Tang Qianting
Olympic Qualifying Time – 1:07.07	1	Estonia	Eneli Jefimova
Olympic Qualifying Time – 1:07.07	1	Finland	Ida Hulkko
Olympic Qualifying Time – 1:07.07	1	Ireland	Mona McSharry
Olympic Qualifying Time – 1:07.07	1	Israel	Anastasia Gorbenko
Olympic Qualifying Time – 1:07.07	1	Jamaica	Alia Atkinson
Olympic Qualifying Time – 1:07.07	1	Netherlands	Tes Schouten
Olympic Qualifying Time – 1:07.07	1	South Africa	Tatjana Schoenmaker
Olympic Qualifying Time – 1:07.07	1	Spain	Jessica Vall
Olympic Qualifying Time – 1:07.07	1	Switzerland	Lisa Mamie
Olympic Selection Time – 1:09.08	1	Bulgaria	Diana Petkova^{[a]}
Olympic Selection Time – 1:09.08	1	Croatia	Ema Rajić^{[b]}
Olympic Selection Time – 1:09.08	1	Germany	Anna Elendt
Olympic Selection Time – 1:09.08	1	Lithuania	Kotryna Teterevkova^{[b]}
Olympic Selection Time – 1:09.08	1	Malaysia	Phee Jinq En^{[b]}
Olympic Selection Time – 1:09.08	1	Mexico	Melissa Rodríguez^{[b]}
Universality Places	1	American Samoa	Tilali Scanlan
Universality Places	1	Cape Verde	Jayla Pina
Universality Places	1	Cook Islands	Kirsten Fisher-Marsters
Universality Places	1	Federated States of Micronesia	Taeyanna Adams
Universality Places	0	~~Guinea~~	~~Mariama Touré~~
Universality Places	1	Haiti	Emilie Grand'Pierre
Universality Places	1	Maldives	Aishath Sajina
Universality Places	1	Mauritius	Alicia Kok Shun
Universality Places	1	Monaco	Claudia Verdino
Universality Places	1	Panama	Emily Santos
Universality Places	1	Slovakia	Andrea Podmaníková^{[c]}
Universality Places	1	Turkmenistan	Darya Semyonova
Universality Places	1	Yemen	Nooran Ba-Matraf
Total	47		

==== Women's 200 m breaststroke ====
Qualification standard	No. of athletes	NOC	Qualified swimmers
Olympic Qualifying Time – 2:25.52	2	Australia	Abbey Harkin; Jenna Strauch
Olympic Qualifying Time – 2:25.52	2	Canada	Sydney Pickrem; Kelsey Wog
Olympic Qualifying Time – 2:25.52	2	Great Britain	Molly Renshaw; Abbie Wood
Olympic Qualifying Time – 2:25.52	2	ROC	Evgenia Chikunova; Maria Temnikova
Olympic Qualifying Time – 2:25.52	2	South Africa	Kaylene Corbett; Tatjana Schoenmaker
Olympic Qualifying Time – 2:25.52	2	Spain	Marina García; Jessica Vall
Olympic Qualifying Time – 2:25.52	2	United States	Lilly King; Annie Lazor
Olympic Qualifying Time – 2:25.52	1	Argentina	Julia Sebastián
Olympic Qualifying Time – 2:25.52	1	Belarus	Alina Zmushka
Olympic Qualifying Time – 2:25.52	1	Belgium	Fanny Lecluyse
Olympic Qualifying Time – 2:25.52	1	China	Yu Jingyao
Olympic Qualifying Time – 2:25.52	1	Czech Republic	Kristýna Horská
Olympic Qualifying Time – 2:25.52	1	Hungary	Eszter Békési
Olympic Qualifying Time – 2:25.52	1	Italy	Francesca Fangio
Olympic Qualifying Time – 2:25.52	1	Japan	Kanako Watanabe
Olympic Qualifying Time – 2:25.52	1	Sweden	Sophie Hansson
Olympic Qualifying Time – 2:25.52	1	Switzerland	Lisa Mamie
Olympic Selection Time – 2:29.89	1	Estonia	Eneli Jefimova^{[a]}
Olympic Selection Time – 2:29.89	1	Ireland	Mona McSharry^{[a]}
Olympic Selection Time – 2:29.89	1	Lithuania	Kotryna Teterevkova^{[b]}
Olympic Selection Time – 2:29.89	1	Mexico	Melissa Rodríguez^{[b]}
Olympic Selection Time – 2:29.89	1	Slovakia	Andrea Podmaníková^{[b]}
Universality Places	1	Malaysia	Phee Jinq En^{[c]}
Universality Places	1	Maldives	Aishath Sajina
Total	31		

==== Women's 100 m butterfly ====
Qualification standard	No. of athletes	NOC	Qualified swimmers
Olympic Qualifying Time – 57.92	2	Australia	Emma McKeon; Brianna Throssell
Olympic Qualifying Time – 57.92	2	Canada	Maggie MacNeil; Katerine Savard
Olympic Qualifying Time – 57.92	2	Italy	Ilaria Bianchi; Elena di Liddo
Olympic Qualifying Time – 57.92	2	ROC	Svetlana Chimrova; Arina Surkova
Olympic Qualifying Time – 57.92	2	Sweden	Louise Hansson; Sarah Sjöström
Olympic Qualifying Time – 57.92	2	United States	Claire Curzan; Torri Huske
Olympic Qualifying Time – 57.92	1	Belarus	Anastasiya Shkurdai
Olympic Qualifying Time – 57.92	1	Bosnia and Herzegovina	Lana Pudar
Olympic Qualifying Time – 57.92	1	China	Zhang Yufei
Olympic Qualifying Time – 57.92	1	Denmark	Emilie Beckmann
Olympic Qualifying Time – 57.92	1	Egypt	Farida Osman
Olympic Qualifying Time – 57.92	1	France	Marie Wattel
Olympic Qualifying Time – 57.92	1	Great Britain	Harriet Jones
Olympic Qualifying Time – 57.92	1	Greece	Anna Ntountounaki
Olympic Qualifying Time – 57.92	1	South Africa	Erin Gallagher
Olympic Selection Time – 59.66	1	Hungary	Dalma Sebestyén^{[a]}
Olympic Selection Time – 59.66	1	Ireland	Ellen Walshe^{[a]}
Olympic Selection Time – 59.66	1	Israel	Anastasia Gorbenko^{[a]}
Olympic Selection Time – 59.66	1	Philippines	Remedy Rule^{[b]}
Olympic Selection Time – 59.66	1	South Korea	An Se-hyeon
Universality Places	1	Azerbaijan	Mariam Sheikhalizadehkhanghah
Universality Places	1	Paraguay	Luana Alonso
Universality Places	1	Puerto Rico	Miriam Sheehan^{[c]}
Universality Places	1	Sri Lanka	Aniqah Gaffoor
Universality Places	1	Venezuela	Jeserik Pinto^{[c]}
Invitational Places	1	Refugee Olympic Team	Yusra Mardini
Total	42		

==== Women's 200 m butterfly ====
Qualification standard	No. of athletes	NOC	Qualified swimmers
Olympic Qualifying Time – 2:08.43	2	China	Yu Liyan; Zhang Yufei
Olympic Qualifying Time – 2:08.43	2	Great Britain	Laura Stephens; Alys Thomas
Olympic Qualifying Time – 2:08.43	2	Hungary	Katinka Hosszú; Boglárka Kapás
Olympic Qualifying Time – 2:08.43	2	United States	Hali Flickinger; Regan Smith
Olympic Qualifying Time – 2:08.43	1	Australia	Brianna Throssell
Olympic Qualifying Time – 2:08.43	1	Germany	Franziska Hentke
Olympic Qualifying Time – 2:08.43	1	Japan	Suzuka Hasegawa
Olympic Qualifying Time – 2:08.43	1	Portugal	Ana Monteiro
Olympic Qualifying Time – 2:08.43	1	ROC	Svetlana Chimrova
Olympic Selection Time – 2:12.28	1	Denmark	Helena Rosendahl Bach^{[a]}
Olympic Selection Time – 2:12.28	1	Philippines	Remedy Rule^{[b]}
Olympic Selection Time – 2:12.28	1	Turkey	Defne Taçyıldız
Universality Places	1	Honduras	Julimar Ávila
Total	17		

==== Women's 200 m individual medley ====
Qualification standard	No. of athletes	NOC	Qualified swimmers
Olympic Qualifying Time – 2:12.56	2	Canada	Bailey Andison; Sydney Pickrem
Olympic Qualifying Time – 2:12.56	2	China	Chen Xinyi; Yu Yiting
Olympic Qualifying Time – 2:12.56	2	France	Cyrielle Duhamel; Fantine Lesaffre
Olympic Qualifying Time – 2:12.56	2	Great Britain	Alicia Wilson; Abbie Wood
Olympic Qualifying Time – 2:12.56	2	Hungary	Katinka Hosszú; Dalma Sebestyén
Olympic Qualifying Time – 2:12.56	2	Italy	Ilaria Cusinato; Sara Franceschi
Olympic Qualifying Time – 2:12.56	2	Japan	Yui Ohashi; Miho Teramura
Olympic Qualifying Time – 2:12.56	2	United States	Kate Douglass; Alex Walsh
Olympic Qualifying Time – 2:12.56	0	~~Australia~~	~~Kaylee McKeown~~
Olympic Qualifying Time – 2:12.56	1	Bulgaria	Diana Petkova
Olympic Qualifying Time – 2:12.56	1	Ireland	Ellen Walshe
Olympic Qualifying Time – 2:12.56	1	Israel	Anastasia Gorbenko
Olympic Qualifying Time – 2:12.56	1	South Korea	Kim Seo-yeong
Olympic Qualifying Time – 2:12.56	1	Switzerland	Maria Ugolkova
Olympic Qualifying Time – 2:12.56	1	Turkey	Viktoriya Zeynep Güneş
Olympic Selection Time – 2:16.54	1	Czech Republic	Kristýna Horská^{[a]}
Olympic Selection Time – 2:16.54	1	Peru	McKenna DeBever^{[b]}
Olympic Selection Time – 2:16.54	1	Serbia	Anja Crevar^{[a]}
Olympic Selection Time – 2:16.54	1	South Africa	Rebecca Meder
Olympic Selection Time – 2:16.54	1	Spain	África Zamorano^{[a]}
Universality Places	1	Uruguay	Nicole Frank
Total	29		

==== Women's 400 m individual medley ====
Qualification standard	No. of athletes	NOC	Qualified swimmers
Olympic Qualifying Time – 4:38.53	2	Canada	Tessa Cieplucha; Sydney Pickrem
Olympic Qualifying Time – 4:38.53	2	Italy	Ilaria Cusinato; Sara Franceschi
Olympic Qualifying Time – 4:38.53	2	Japan	Yui Ohashi; Ageha Tanigawa
Olympic Qualifying Time – 4:38.53	2	Hungary	Katinka Hosszú; Viktória Mihályvári-Farkas
Olympic Qualifying Time – 4:38.53	2	United States	Hali Flickinger; Emma Weyant
Olympic Qualifying Time – 4:38.53	1	China	Yu Yiting
Olympic Qualifying Time – 4:38.53	1	France	Fantine Lesaffre
Olympic Qualifying Time – 4:38.53	1	Great Britain	Aimee Willmott
Olympic Qualifying Time – 4:38.53	1	Serbia	Anja Crevar
Olympic Qualifying Time – 4:38.53	1	Spain	Mireia Belmonte
Olympic Selection Time – 4:46.89	1	Argentina	Virginia Bardach
Olympic Selection Time – 4:46.89	1	Israel	Anastasia Gorbenko^{[a]}
Olympic Selection Time – 4:46.89	1	Slovenia	Katja Fain^{[a]}
Universality Places	1	Indonesia	Azzahra Permatahani
Total	19		

== Relay events ==
16 teams qualify in each relay event, for a total of 112 relay teams.

Teams can qualify by one of two routes:

- The twelve highest placed nations in relay events at the 18th FINA World Championships 2019 in Gwangju qualified for the corresponding relay event at the Olympic Games Tokyo 2020 based upon the results achieved in the heats.
- The remaining four teams per relay event will be the teams with the fastest times in the FINA World Rankings of 31 May 2021 achieved during the qualification period, in the qualifying events approved by FINA
- If any of the qualified teams from either group are not able to participate for any reason, the next highest ranked eligible team from the FINA World Rankings will be offered the relay team quota place.

=== Qualification summary ===
NOC	Men			Women			Mixed	Total
NOC	4 × 100 free	4 × 200 free	4 × 100 medley	4 × 100 free	4 × 200 free	4 × 100 medley	4 × 100 medley	Total
Australia	Yes	Yes	Yes	Yes	Yes	Yes	Yes	7
Belarus			Yes			Yes	Yes	3
Brazil	Yes	Yes	Yes	Yes	Yes		Yes	6
Canada	Yes		Yes	Yes	Yes	Yes	Yes	6
China		Yes	Yes	Yes	Yes	Yes	Yes	6
Czech Republic				Yes				1
Denmark				Yes		Yes		2
France	Yes	Yes	Yes	Yes	Yes			5
Germany	Yes	Yes	Yes	Yes	Yes	Yes	Yes	7
Great Britain	Yes	Yes	Yes	Yes		Yes	Yes	6
Greece	Yes		Yes				Yes	3
Hong Kong				Yes	Yes	Yes		3
Hungary	Yes	Yes	Yes		Yes		Yes	5
Ireland		Yes						1
Israel		Yes					Yes	2
Italy	Yes	Yes	Yes		Yes	Yes	Yes	6
Japan	Yes	Yes	Yes	Yes	Yes	Yes	Yes	7
Lithuania			Yes					1
Netherlands	Yes			Yes		Yes	Yes	4
New Zealand					Yes			1
Poland	Yes	Yes	Yes	Yes			Yes	5
ROC	Yes	Yes	Yes	Yes	Yes	Yes	Yes	7
Serbia	Yes							1
South Africa					Yes	Yes		2
South Korea		Yes			Yes			2
Spain						Yes		1
Sweden				Yes		Yes		2
Switzerland	Yes	Yes						2
Turkey					Yes			1
United States	Yes	Yes	Yes	Yes	Yes	Yes	Yes	7
Total: 29 NOCs	16	16	16	16	16	16	16	

=== Men's 4 × 100 m freestyle relay ===
Qualification event	No. of teams	Qualified teams
2019 World Championships	12	United States; Great Britain; ROC; Australia; Italy; Brazil; France; Hungary; Japan; Greece; Germany; Poland
Best times of non-qualifiers	4	Canada; Switzerland; Serbia; Netherlands
Total	16	

=== Men's 4 × 200 m freestyle relay ===
Qualification event	No. of teams	Qualified teams
2019 World Championships	12	Italy; ROC; United States; Australia; China; Brazil; Great Britain; Germany; Japan; Israel; Poland; Switzerland
Best times of non-qualifiers	4	France; Hungary; Ireland; South Korea
Total	16	

=== Men's 4 × 100 m medley relay ===
Qualification event	No. of teams	Qualified teams
2019 World Championships	12	ROC; United States; Japan; Great Britain; Australia; Brazil; China; Germany; Belarus; Canada; Lithuania; Hungary
Best times of non-qualifiers	4	Italy; France; Poland; Greece
Total	16	

=== Women's 4 × 100 m freestyle relay ===
Qualification event	No. of teams	Qualified teams
2019 World Championships	12	Australia; Canada; Sweden; United States; Japan; Netherlands; China; Germany; ROC; Hong Kong; Czech Republic; Poland
Best times of non-qualifiers	4	Great Britain; France; Denmark; Brazil
Total	16	

=== Women's 4 × 200 m freestyle relay ===
Qualification event	No. of teams	Qualified teams
2019 World Championships	12	Australia; United States; ROC; China; Germany; Canada; Hungary; Japan; ~~Poland~~; New Zealand; Hong Kong; South Korea
Best times of non-qualifiers	4	~~Great Britain~~; Italy; France; ~~Israel~~
Reallocation of unused quota	5	Brazil; ~~Denmark~~; ~~Belgium~~; Turkey; South Africa
Total	16	

=== Women's 4 × 100 m medley relay ===
Qualification event	No. of teams	Qualified teams
2019 World Championships	12	United States; Australia; Italy; Canada; China; Sweden; Great Britain; Japan; Germany; Netherlands; ~~Switzerland~~; ROC
Best times of non-qualifiers	4	Belarus; ~~Finland~~; Hong Kong; South Africa
Reallocation of unused quota	2	Denmark; Spain
Total	16	

=== Mixed 4 × 100 m medley relay ===
Qualification event	No. of teams	Qualified teams
2019 World Championships	12	United States; Australia; ROC; Great Britain; Canada; Italy; Netherlands; Germany; Belarus; Israel; Poland; Hungary
Best times of non-qualifiers	4	China; Japan; Greece; Brazil
Total	16	

== Open water events ==
=== Timeline ===
Event	Date	Venue
2019 World Aquatics Championships	July 12–28, 2019	(South Korea) Gwangju
2021 FINA Olympic Marathon Swim Qualifier	June 19–20, 2021	(Portugal) Setúbal

=== Men's 10 km marathon ===
Qualification event	No. of athletes	Qualified athletes
2019 World Championships	10	Florian Wellbrock (GER); Marc-Antoine Olivier (FRA); Rob Muffels (GER); Kristóf Rasovszky (HUN); Jordan Wilimovsky (USA); Gregorio Paltrinieri (ITA); Ferry Weertman (NED); Alberto Martínez (ESP); Mario Sanzullo (ITA); David Aubry (FRA)
2020 Olympic Marathon Swim Qualifier	11	Hector Pardoe (GBR); Athanasios Kynigakis (GRE); Matan Roditi (ISR); Kai Edwards (AUS); Taishin Minamide (JPN); Tiago Campos (POR); Kirill Abrosimov (ROC); David Farinango (ECU); Oussama Mellouli (TUN); Michael McGlynn (RSA)° Daniel Delgadillo (MEX)^
Continental Qualifier	4	Matej Kozubek (CZE); Hau-Li Fan (CAN); Phillip Seidler (NAM); William Yan Thorley (HKG)
Host country	0	—
Total	25	

° Unused host quota place
^ Unused continental quota place

- No eligible athlete from Oceania competed in the men's race at the 2020 Olympic Marathon Swim Qualifier, which meant the top 10 qualified.

=== Women's 10 km marathon ===
Qualification event	No. of athletes	Qualified athletes
2019 World Championships	10	Xin Xin (CHN); Haley Anderson (USA); Rachele Bruni (ITA); Lara Grangeon (FRA); Ana Marcela Cunha (BRA); Ashley Twichell (USA); Kareena Lee (AUS); Finnia Wunram (GER); Leonie Beck (GER); Sharon van Rouwendaal (NED)
2020 Olympic Marathon Swim Qualifier	10	Anna Olasz (HUN); Paula Ruiz (ESP); Kate Sanderson (CAN); Alice Dearing (GBR); Angélica André (POR); Cecilia Biagioli (ARG); Anastasiya Kirpichnikova (ROC); Samantha Arévalo (ECU); Špela Perše (SLO); Michelle Weber (RSA)^
Continental Qualifier	4	Souad Cherouati (ALG); Paola Pérez (VEN); Krystyna Panchishko (UKR); Chantal Liew (SGP)
Host country	1	Yumi Kida (JPN)
Total	25	

^ Unused continental quota place

- No eligible athlete from Oceania competed in the women's race at the 2020 Olympic Marathon Swim Qualifier, which meant the top 10 qualified.

== Notes ==
a.	Qualified in other events
b.	Under universality place, but reached the Olympic Selection Time
c.	Achieved the Olympic Selection Time in another event.
