= Swimming at the 2020 Summer Olympics – Men's 1500 metre freestyle =

Men's 1500 metre freestyle at the Games of the XXXII Olympiad
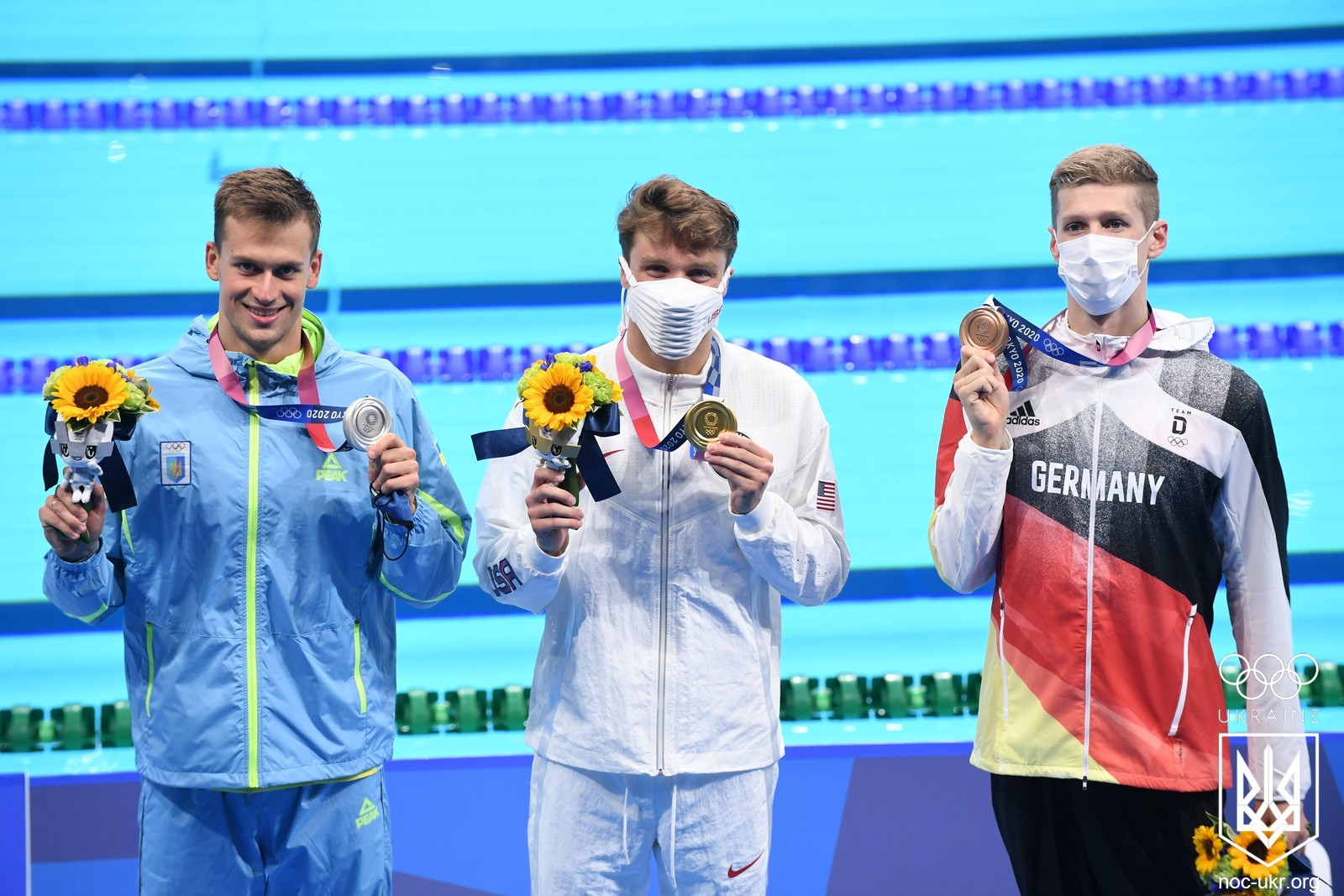
- Venue: Tokyo Aquatics Centre
- Dates: 30 July 2021 (heats); 1 August 2021 (final)
- Competitors: 28 from 20 nations
- Winning time: 14:39.65

Medalists
1st place, gold medalist(s)		Bobby Finke	United States
2nd place, silver medalist(s)		Mykhailo Romanchuk	Ukraine
3rd place, bronze medalist(s)		Florian Wellbrock	Germany

The men's 1500 metre freestyle event at the 2020 Summer Olympics was held on 30 July and 1 August 2021 at the Tokyo Aquatics Centre. It will be the event's twenty-seventh consecutive appearance, having been held at every edition since 1904.

== Summary ==
In similar fashion to his victory in the inaugural 800 freestyle days days earlier, the U.S.' Bobby Finke (14:39.65) came from behind to complete the distance double. In a close affair in the middle lanes, Finke split an astonishing 25.78 on the last 50 to overtake the field and become the first American to win gold in the event since Mike O'Brien in 1984.

In a battle against Germany's Florian Wellbrock, Ukraine's Mykhailo Romanchuk was able to outlast the German at the finish and claim silver in 14:40.66. 2019 World Champion Wellbrock held a 0.72 second advantage over Finke at the final turn but could not withstand the latter's finishing speed, settling for bronze in 14:40.91. Italy's defending champion Gregorio Paltrinieri (14:45.01), who posted a world leading time of 14:33.10 in 2020, faded over the last 150 m to take fourth in 14:45.01. Great Britain's Daniel Jervis (14:55.48), ROC's Kirill Martynychev (14:55.85), Austria's Felix Auboeck (15:03.47) and Ukraine's Serhiy Frolov (15:04.26) rounded out the championship field, with all four swimmers slower than their preliminary times.

== Records ==
Prior to this competition, the existing world and Olympic records were as follows.

World record	Sun Yang (CHN)	14:31.02	London, United Kingdom	4 August 2012
Olympic record	Sun Yang (CHN)	14:31.02	London, United Kingdom	4 August 2012

== Qualification ==
The Olympic Qualifying Time for the event is 15:00.99. Up to two swimmers per National Olympic Committee (NOC) can automatically qualify by swimming that time at an approved qualification event. The Olympic Selection Time is 15:28.02. Up to one swimmer per NOC meeting that time is eligible for selection, allocated by world ranking until the maximum quota for all swimming events is reached. NOCs without a male swimmer qualified in any event can also use their universality place.

== Competition format ==
The competition consists of two rounds: heats and a final. The swimmers with the best 8 times in the heats advance to the final. Swim-offs are used as necessary to break ties for advancement to the next round.

== Schedule ==
All times are Japan Standard Time (UTC+9)

Date	Time	Round
Friday, 30 July 2021	19:48	Heats
Sunday, 1 August 2021	10:44	Final

== Results ==
=== Heats ===
The swimmers with the top 8 times, regardless of heat, advanced to the final.

Rank	Heat	Lane	Swimmer	Nation	Time	Notes
1	4	5	Mykhailo Romanchuk	Ukraine	14:45.99	Q
2	4	3	Bobby Finke	United States	14:47.20	Q
3	3	4	Florian Wellbrock	Germany	14:48.53	Q
4	4	4	Gregorio Paltrinieri	Italy	14:49.17	Q
5	3	3	Daniel Jervis	Great Britain	14:50.22	Q
6	3	7	Sergii Frolov	Ukraine	14:51.83	Q
7	2	8	Felix Auböck	Austria	14:51.88	Q, NR
8	2	3	Kirill Martynychev	ROC	14:52.66	Q
9	3	2	Domenico Acerenza	Italy	14:53.84	
10	4	7	Jack McLoughlin	Australia	14:56.98	
11	4	2	Lukas Märtens	Germany	14:59.45	
12	3	8	Nguyễn Huy Hoàng	Vietnam	15:00.24	
13	4	1	Guilherme Costa	Brazil	15:01.18	
14	3	1	Anton Ipsen	Denmark	15:01.58	
15	2	5	Gergely Gyurta	Hungary	15:01.85	
16	2	4	Thomas Neill	Australia	15:04.65	
17	2	6	Michael Brinegar	United States	15:04.67	
18	2	7	Victor Johansson	Sweden	15:05.53	
19	4	8	Aleksandr Yegorov	ROC	15:06.55	
20	1	5	Daniel Wiffen	Ireland	15:07.69	NR
21	3	5	Henrik Christiansen	Norway	15:11.14	
22	2	2	Ákos Kalmár	Hungary	15:17.02	
23	3	6	Jan Micka	Czech Republic	15:17.71	
24	2	1	Cheng Long	China	15:18.71	
25	1	3	Marcelo Acosta	El Salvador	15:27.37	
26	4	6	Alexander Nørgaard	Denmark	15:28.70	
27	1	4	Aflah Prawira	Indonesia	15:29.94	
28	1	2	Théo Druenne	Monaco	16:17.20	
	1	6	Marwan Elkamash	Egypt	DNS	

=== Final ===
Rank	Lane	Swimmer	Nation	Time	Notes
1st place, gold medalist(s)	5	Bobby Finke	United States	14:39.65	
2nd place, silver medalist(s)	4	Mykhailo Romanchuk	Ukraine	14:40.66	
3rd place, bronze medalist(s)	3	Florian Wellbrock	Germany	14:40.91	
4	6	Gregorio Paltrinieri	Italy	14:45.01	
5	2	Daniel Jervis	Great Britain	14:55.48	
6	8	Kirill Martynychev	ROC	14:55.85	
7	1	Felix Auböck	Austria	15:03.47	
8	7	Serhiy Frolov	Ukraine	15:04.26	

== See also ==
- Swimming at the 2020 Summer Olympics – Women's 1500 metre freestyle
