= Søren Dahl =

Danish swimmer (born 1993)

Personal information
- Nationality: Danish
- Born: 15 July 1993 (age 33) Aarhus, Denmark
- Height: 193 cm (6 ft 4 in)
- Weight: 86 kg (190 lb)

Sport
- Sport: Swimming
- Strokes: Freestyle
- Club: Herlev Svommeklub (DEN)
- College team: North Carolina State University
- Coach: Todd DeSorbo, Braden Holloway (NCSU)

Søren Dahl (born 15 July 1993) is a Danish swimmer who competed for North Carolina State University and represented Denmark at the 2016 Summer Olympics.

== Early life and education ==
Dahl was born on 15 July 1993 in Aarhus, Denmark. He attended high school at Falkonergårdens Gymnasium and competed and trained under Herlev Svommeklub.

== Career ==
=== North Carolina State ===
Beginning in 2013, Dahl studied at North Carolina State University, where he was a member of the NC State swimming and diving team. He trained and competed under Coach Braden Holloway and with Coach Todd DeSorbo through 2017. Dahl won two NCAA titles at the 2016 and 2017 NCAA Division I Men's Swimming and Diving Championships. His first title came as part of the NC State 400 freestyle relay squad, the first national relay championship for NC State and the ACC conference. Then in 2017, the NC State 800 freestyle relay squad won the national championship. Held, Vazaios, Ress, and Dahl put up the fastest time in history setting both NCAA and U.S. open records. As a Junior in 2015–2016, he won All-America Honorable Mention for his performance in the 200 freestyle, and a part of 4x200 800 freestyle relay team that won a second place at the NCAA Championships.

=== 2016 Olympics ===
Dahl competed for Denmark in the men's 4 × 200 metre freestyle relay event at the 2016 Summer Olympics. His relay team finished 7th in Heat 2 and 12th overall with a combined time of 7:12.66.

=== Post-swimming career ===
In 2018, Dahl was named a recipient of the Atlantic Coast Conference Postgraduate Scholarship. The scholarship is awarded to student-athletes that have performed with distinction in both the classroom and their respective sport, while demonstrating exemplary conduct in the community. In May 2018, Dahl was awarded the prestigious Jim McKay Scholarship from the NCAA.

Dahl studied for his master's at Texas Christian University, graduating with a degree in strategic communication in 2020.

== Personal life ==
Dahl is gay. In 2023, Dahl was in a relationship with retired NFL player Carl Nassib, the first active NFL player to come out as gay.
