= Swimming at the 2020 Summer Olympics – Men's 800 metre freestyle =

Men's 800 metre freestyle at the Games of the XXXII Olympiad
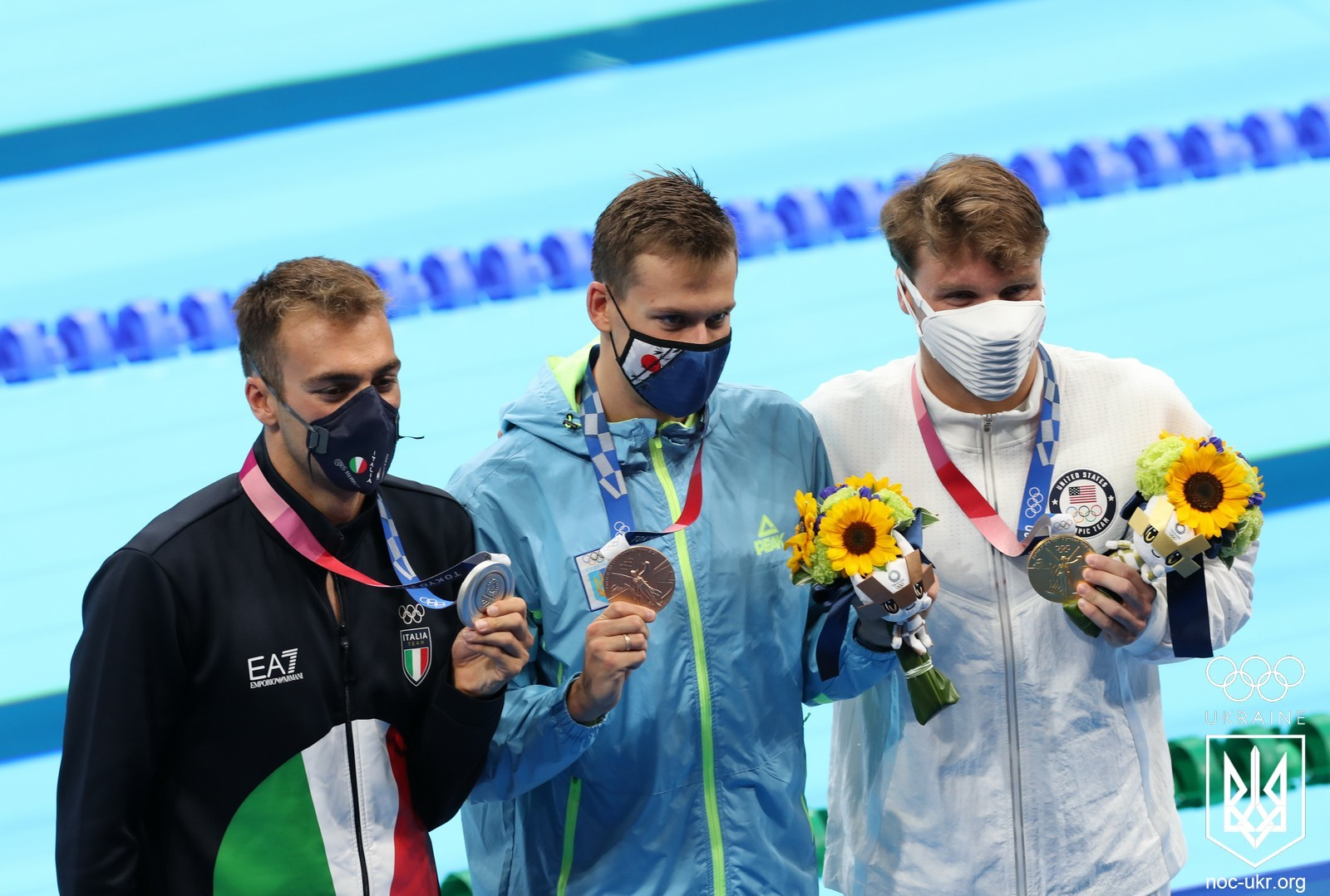
- Venue: Tokyo Aquatics Centre
- Dates: 27 July 2021 (heats); 29 July 2021 (final)
- Competitors: 33 from 28 nations
- Winning time: 7:41.87

Medalists
| 1st place, gold medalist(s) | | Bobby Finke | United States |
| 2nd place, silver medalist(s) | | Gregorio Paltrinieri | Italy |
| 3rd place, bronze medalist(s) | | Mykhailo Romanchuk | Ukraine |

The men's 800 metre freestyle event at the 2020 Summer Olympics was held on 27 and 29 July 2021 at the Tokyo Aquatics Centre. It was the event's recurrence to the Games for the first time in over a century, having last been held in 1904 (at 880 yards).

== Summary ==
The U.S.' Bobby Finke came from behind to win a surprise gold in the inaugural Olympic men's 800-meter freestyle. Fourth at the final turn, Finke unleashed a massive 26.39 split to overtake the field and lower the American record to 7:41.87. Earlier in the heats, Finke broke Michael McBroom's American record after coming into the meet with a personal best time of 7:48.22 set at the U.S. Olympic Trials.

Swimming in lane 8, Italy's reigning World champion Gregorio Paltrinieri was out quickly and established a body-length lead at the 200 m mark. While Germany's Florian Wellbrock and Ukraine's Mykhailo Romanchuk gained control at the halfway stage, Paltrinieri overtook the duo to claim silver in 7:42.11. Despite setting the Olympic record in the heats, Romanchuk was unable to replicate the time and settled for bronze in 7:42.33. Wellbrock was also unable to repeat his German record from the heats, narrowly missing the podium by 0.35 seconds.

Australia's Jack McLoughlin, who claimed silver in the 400 m freestyle on night one, picked up the fifth spot with a 7:45.00 to hold off Ukraine's Serhiy Frolov (7:45.11) by 11 one-hundredths of a second. Austria's Felix Auboeck finished seventh in 7:49.14, with Brazil's Guilherme Costa (7:53.31) rounding out the top eight field.

== Records ==
Prior to this competition, the existing world and Olympic records were as follows.

| World record | Zhang Lin (CHN) | 7:32.12 | Rome, Italy | 29 July 2009 | |
| Olympic record | Inaugural event | — | — | — | — |

The following record was established during the competition:

| Date | Event | Swimmer | Nation | Time | Record |
|---|---|---|---|---|---|
| July 27 | Heat 4 | Mykhailo Romanchuk | Ukraine | 7:41.28 | OR |

== Qualification ==
The Olympic Qualifying Time for the event is 7:54.31. Up to two swimmers per National Olympic Committee (NOC) can automatically qualify by swimming that time at an approved qualification event. The Olympic Selection Time is 8:08.54. Up to one swimmer per NOC meeting that time is eligible for selection, allocated by world ranking until the maximum quota for all swimming events is reached. NOCs without a male swimmer qualified in any event can also use their universality place.

== Competition format ==
The competition consists of two rounds: heats and a final. The swimmers with the best 8 times in the heats advance to the final. Swim-offs are used as necessary to break ties for advancement to the next round.

== Schedule ==
All times are Japan Standard Time (UTC+9)

| Date | Time | Round |
|---|---|---|
| Tuesday, 27 July 2021 | 20:17 | Heats |
| Thursday, 29 July 2021 | 10:30 | Final |

== Results ==
=== Heats ===
The swimmers with the top 8 times, regardless of heat, advanced to the final.

| Rank | Heat | Lane | Swimmer | Nation | Time | Notes |
|---|---|---|---|---|---|---|
| 1 | 4 | 5 | Mykhailo Romanchuk | Ukraine | 7:41.28 | Q, OR, NR |
| 2 | 4 | 3 | Florian Wellbrock | Germany | 7:41.77 | Q, NR |
| 3 | 4 | 7 | Bobby Finke | United States | 7:42.72 | Q, NR |
| 4 | 5 | 2 | Felix Auböck | Austria | 7:45.73 | Q, NR |
| 5 | 5 | 7 | Guilherme Costa | Brazil | 7:46.09 | Q, SA |
| 6 | 5 | 3 | Jack McLoughlin | Australia | 7:46.94 | Q |
| 7 | 4 | 2 | Serhiy Frolov | Ukraine | 7:47.67 | Q |
| 8 | 5 | 4 | Gregorio Paltrinieri | Italy | 7:47.73 | Q |
| 9 | 4 | 4 | Henrik Christiansen | Norway | 7:48.37 | |
| 10 | 4 | 6 | Ahmed Hafnaoui | Tunisia | 7:49.14 | |
| 10 | 1 | 4 | Victor Johansson | Sweden | 7:49.14 | NR |
| 12 | 5 | 6 | Gabriele Detti | Italy | 7:49.47 | |
| 13 | 5 | 1 | Aleksandr Yegorov | ROC | 7:49.97 | |
| 14 | 3 | 8 | Daniel Wiffen | Ireland | 7:51.65 | NR |
| 15 | 3 | 5 | Alfonso Mestre | Venezuela | 7:52.07 | |
| 16 | 3 | 7 | Marwan El-Kamash | Egypt | 7:52.76 | |
| 17 | 4 | 8 | Michael Brinegar | United States | 7:53.00 | |
| 18 | 2 | 6 | Zac Reid | New Zealand | 7:53.06 | NR |
| 19 | 3 | 1 | Alexander Nørgaard | Denmark | 7:53.50 | |
| 20 | 2 | 5 | Nguyễn Huy Hoàng | Vietnam | 7:54.16 | |
| 21 | 4 | 1 | Anton Ipsen | Denmark | 7:54.98 | |
| 22 | 2 | 1 | Ákos Kalmár | Hungary | 7:55.85 | |
| 23 | 2 | 4 | José Lopes | Portugal | 7:56.15 | |
| 24 | 3 | 6 | Yiğit Aslan | Turkey | 7:56.18 | |
| 25 | 3 | 4 | Kieran Bird | Great Britain | 7:57.53 | |
| 26 | 2 | 3 | Dimitrios Markos | Greece | 7:58.68 | |
| 27 | 2 | 7 | Cheng Long | China | 7:58.71 | |
| 28 | 5 | 8 | Jan Micka | Czech Republic | 7:59.04 | |
| 29 | 5 | 5 | David Aubry | France | 8:00.16 | |
| 30 | 3 | 2 | Ilya Druzhinin | ROC | 8:01.47 | |
| 31 | 1 | 3 | Marcelo Acosta | El Salvador | 8:03.01 | |
| 32 | 1 | 5 | Martin Bau | Slovenia | 8:04.79 | |
| 33 | 2 | 2 | Vuk Čelić | Serbia | 8:04.85 | |
| | 3 | 3 | Konstantinos Englezakis | Greece | DNS | |

=== Final ===
| Rank | Lane | Swimmer | Nation | Time | Notes |
|---|---|---|---|---|---|
| 1st place, gold medalist(s) | 3 | Bobby Finke | United States | 7:41.87 | NR |
| 2nd place, silver medalist(s) | 8 | Gregorio Paltrinieri | Italy | 7:42.11 | |
| 3rd place, bronze medalist(s) | 4 | Mykhailo Romanchuk | Ukraine | 7:42.33 | |
| 4 | 5 | Florian Wellbrock | Germany | 7:42.68 | |
| 5 | 7 | Jack McLoughlin | Australia | 7:45.00 | |
| 6 | 1 | Serhiy Frolov | Ukraine | 7:45.11 | |
| 7 | 6 | Felix Auböck | Austria | 7:49.14 | |
| 8 | 2 | Guilherme Costa | Brazil | 7:53.31 | |

== See also ==
- Swimming at the 2020 Summer Olympics – Women's 800 metre freestyle
