= Simonas Bilis =

Lithuanian swimmer (born 1993)

Personal information
- Nationality: Lithuanian
- Born: 11 November 1993 (age 32) Panevėžys, Lithuania
- Height: 1.99 m (6 ft 6 in)
- Weight: 103 kg (227 lb)

Sport
- Sport: Swimming
- Strokes: Freestyle
- Club: Energy Standard; Panevėžio Žemyna (PZ)
- College team: North Carolina State University
- Coach: Ina Simeliūnaitė (PZ); Todd DeSorbo, Braden Holloway (NCSU)
Medal record
Representing Lithuania
World Championships (SC)
Gold medal – first place	2016 Windsor	100 m freestyle
Bronze medal – third place	2016 Windsor	50 m freestyle
Baltic States Championships
Gold medal – first place	2021 Klaipėda	100 m freestyle
Gold medal – first place	2021 Klaipėda	4x100 m medley
Gold medal – first place	2011 Riga	4x100 m medley
Bronze medal – third place	2011 Riga	100 m freestyle
Bronze medal – third place	2011 Riga	4x100 m freestyle
Representing the NC State Wolfpack
Event	1st	2nd	3rd
NCAA Championships	1	7	2
Total	1	7	2
By race
Event	1st	2nd	3rd
50 y freestyle	0	1	1
100 y freestyle	0	2	0
200 y freestyle	0	0	1
4×50 y freestyle	0	1	0
4×100 y freestyle	1	1	0
4×200 y freestyle	0	2	0
Total	1	7	2
NCAA Championships
Gold medal – first place	2016 Atlanta	4×100 y freestyle
Silver medal – second place	2015 Iowa City	100 y freestyle
Silver medal – second place	2015 Iowa City	4×100 y freestyle
Silver medal – second place	2015 Iowa City	4×200 y freestyle
Silver medal – second place	2016 Atlanta	50 y freestyle
Silver medal – second place	2016 Atlanta	100 y freestyle
Silver medal – second place	2016 Atlanta	4×50 y freestyle
Silver medal – second place	2016 Atlanta	4×200 y freestyle
Bronze medal – third place	2015 Iowa City	50 y freestyle
Bronze medal – third place	2015 Iowa City	200 y freestyle

Simonas Bilis (born 11 November 1993) is a Lithuanian swimmer, who competed for North Carolina State University from 2012-2016. He is a Lithuanian national record holder in the 50 and 100-meter freestyle (long course) and the 50 and 100-meter freestyle (short course) and represented Lithuania in the 2016 London and 2020 Tokyo Olympics.

Simonas Bilis was born 11 November 1993 in Panevėžys, Lithuania, and attended High School at Panevezys Vytautas Zemkalnis. He swam for his hometown's Panevezys Zemynos Club and received coaching from Ina Simeliūnaitė.

Bilis represented Lithuania at the 2015 World Aquatics Championships where he finished 20th in the 50m freestyle.

== North Carolina State University ==
Bilis swam for North Carolina State University (NCSU) from 2012-2016, where he was trained and mentored by Coaches Todd DeSorbo and Braden Holloway. He was an ACC Male Swimmer of the Year in both 2015 and 2016. While at NCSU, he earned All-America honors first as a Freshman in 2013 in the 200, 400, and 800 freestyle relay, and in his Sophomore years was a 2014 All-America swimmer in the 50 and 100 freestyle and the 400 and 800 freestyle relays.

As a Junior, he won 2014 All-America Honors in the 50, 100, and 200 freestyle and the 400 and 800 freestyle relays, and expanding his most recognized events as a Senior took 2016 All America Honors as a Senior in the 50, 100 and 200 freestyle, the 200, 400, and 800 freestyle relays, and the 200 Medley Relay.

In NCAA Championship competition including 2015 in Iowa City, and 2016 in Atlanta, he had a first place in the 4x100 yard freestyle relay in 2016, seven second place finishes in the 50 and 100-yard freestyle and the 4x50, 4x100, and 4x200-yard freestyle relays and two third places in the 50 and 200-yard freestyle events.

In 2016, he broke the Lithuanian national record with a 48.64 in the men's 100m freestyle and qualified for the 2016 Olympics.

== 2016-2020 Olympics ==
At the 2016 Rio de Janeiro Olympics, he competed in the 50 and 100 meter freestyles, and the 4x100-meter medley. In his best showing, Bilis finished 8th overall in the 50-meter freestyle where he made the finals, and swam a time of 22.08, finishing less than a second from contending for the bronze medal. The medal order was Anthony Ervin of America with the Gold, Florent Manaudou of Italy for the Silver, and American Nathan Adrian for the bronze with a time of 21.49.

Bilis placed 30th overall in the 100-meter freestyle with a time of 49.16, and 14th overall in the 4x100-meter Medley relay where his team recorded a combined time of 3:35.90, and he had the honor of swimming the last 100 leg as the anchor swimmer.

In the 2020 Tokyo Olympics where sixteen countries competed, the Lithuanian team was disqualified in the second heat.

== International Swimming League ==
In the Autumn of 2019 he was a member of the inaugural International Swimming League (ISL) a professional swimming organization. He swam for the ISL's Energy Standard Swim Club, winning the team title in Las Vegas, Nevada, in December, 2019. Since 2019 he has trained with the club full-time.

In November 2022 Bilis announced his retirement from competitive swimming.

== Personal bests ==
Long course
Event	Time	Meet
50 m freestyle	21.70 NR	2018 European Championships
100 m freestyle	48.64 NR	2016 Canadian Olympic and Para-swimming Trials

Short course
Event	Time	Meet
50 m freestyle	20.98 NR	2019 European Championships (25 m)
100 m freestyle	46.11 NR	2018 FINA World Championships (25 m)

== International championships (50 m) ==
Meet	50 free	100 free	200 free	4×100 free	4×200 free	4×100 medley	4×100 medley (mix)
EC 2012	38th	47th	36th				—N/a
EC 2014	32nd	46th	35th	7th			—N/a
WC 2015	20th			19th			
EC 2016	9th	10th		11th		5th	—N/a
OG 2016	8th	30th				14th	—N/a
WC 2017	29th	43rd				17th	
EC 2018	5th	12th		13th	12th	4th	
WC 2019	21st	21st				11th	
EC 2020	42nd	29th		16th		9th	24th
OG 2020						15th^{[a]}	

^{a} Team Lithuania was disqualified in the heats
