= Braden Holloway =

American swimming coach (born 1979)

Braden C. Holloway
Biographical details
- Born: September 14, 1979 (age 47); Baton Rouge, Louisiana
- Education: North Carolina State 2001; U. Virginia MA Education 2007

Playing career
- 1997–2001: North Carolina State; Coach Scott Hammond
- Position: Backstroke

Coaching career (HC unless noted)
- 2003–2004: U. of the South
- 2008–2011: Virginia Tech
- 2011–: North Carolina State

Head coaching record
- Overall: 149-54-1 (NC State thru 2024); NC State Men: 76-18-1; NC State Women: 73-36

Accomplishments and honors

Championships
- NC State Women NCAA Runner-ups (2021); 9 ACC Conference Championships by 2024 (NC State Men)

Awards
- 10xACC Men's Coach of Year; CSCAA 100 Greatest Coaches

Braden Creath Holloway (born September 14, 1979) is an American former swimmer and swim coach for North Carolina State University where as head coach from 2011–2025, he was a recipient of the Atlantic Coast Conference Men's Coach of the year ten times, and by 2024 had led the North Carolina men's team to nine consecutive top ten NCAA team championship finishes. By the 2024 season, the North Carolina State women's team had finished in the top 10 at the NCAA championships five years in a row, and placed second at the NCAA Championships in 2021. Holloway has served as the assistant Olympic U.S. swimming coach at the 2024 Paris Olympics, and as a head coach for USA Swimming.

With many world ranked swimmers on his teams, as of 2024 he had coached around 15 future Olympians at NC State. These included 2016 and 2024 American Olympic gold medalist, Ryan Held, 2024 Olympic gold medalist Katharine Berkoff, and 2020 Swiss Olympic bronze medalist Noe Ponti.

== High school swimming ==
Holloway was born September 14, 1979 in Baton Rouge, Louisiana, and swam for Baton Rouge's Louisiana State Aquatics in the summer of 1991, also known as the Bengal Tiger Aquatic Club where he continued to train during most of his high school years from 1992–1997. He graduated Baton Rouge High School in 1997, where he lettered in swimming all four years of his athletic eligibility. From 1993–1995, he was a Louisiana State Champion, and was a two event state champion in 1996, when he captained the Baton Rouge High swimming team. In his Senior year at Baton Rouge in 1997, he received the honor of being named an Honorable Mention All American. As of 2021, he held the Baton Rouge High School record in both the 100 backstroke and 200 Individual Medley.

== North Carolina State swimmer ==
From 1997–2001, he earned letters at North Carolina State University all four years of his swimming participation and was trained and managed primarily under the supervision of Head Coach Scott Hammond who coached the NCSU swim team from 1995–2000. Hammond had previously coached at Ohio State through 1995, where he earned a 70.9 winning percentage in 185 dual meets.

Holloway received consecutive ACC titles from 2000–2001 in the 100 backstroke, and was honored as an All ACC conference swimming competitor all four years of his collegiate career. He qualified to compete in U.S. Trials for the 2000 Sydney Olympics, and was a multi-year collegiate All-American. He set a long standing NC State record for the 100 backstroke in 2000.

In 2001, Holloway earned his NC State degree, majoring in parks, recreation and tourism. Completing a graduate degree at Virginia tech in mid-2007, he received a master's in education.

== Coaching ==
=== University of the South ===
At the University of the South as an assistant coach from 2003–04, he led swimmer Matthew Martelli to receive honors as an All-American, while seven of his swimmers earned individual titles, and the team set four new school records.

=== Virginia Tech ===
While at Virginia Tech where he served first as an assistant and then head coach, and recruiter from 2008–2011, his teams improved yearly, with swimmers setting more than 30 records for the university, and over 20 of his swimmers achieving All-American honors. He led fifteen of his swimmers to receive championship titles in the Atlantic Coast Conference annual championship competition.

=== North Carolina State ===
On June 29, 2011, Holloway was named as head coach of the North Carolina State Men's and Women's Wolfpack swimming and diving team. Consistently receiving recognition as a rising program, by 2025, Holloway had been named the Atlantic Coast Conference Coach of the year ten times covering the years 2013, 2015–2020, 2022, 2023, and 2024, and was named the ACC Women's Coach of the Year in 2017.

Dominating at the conference level and recognized at the national level, Holloway led the North Carolina State men to a third consecutive title in the Atlantic Coast Conference and a fifth-place finish at the NCAA championships in the 2023–24 season. By 2024, he had won the most awards of any ACC coach. At the 2024 NCAA Championships in Indianapolis, the men's team set two American records, and received ten All American and ten honorable mention honorees. From 2022–2024, the North Carolina men won three consecutive ACC championships. Dominating the conference under Holloway in 2024, the North Carolina State Men's team won their third consecutive Atlantic Coast Conference Championship, having won the conference nine times in the last ten years. Holloway was known for challenging his swimmers to perform pull-ups during their training.

In the 2023–24 season, demonstrating consistency and skill despite lacking the depth of other teams, the North Carolina State women finished the season at the NCAA Championship in the top ten for their fifth consecutive season, in spite of being one of the smallest women teams with such a high rating. With one of their top finishes, in 2021, the North Carolina State women finished second as a team at the NCAA championships.

=== International coaching ===
Holloway was selected as an assistant coach under Head Coach Todd DeSorbo for the U.S. Olympic team at the 2024 Paris Olympics, and was the coach for both the U.S. Men's and Women's teams at the 2025 World Championships. DeSorbo had been an associate head coach at North Carolina State between 2011–2017 when Holloway began his career there. DeSorbo would later coach swimming for rival University of Virginia beginning in 2017.

At the 2022 World Short Course Championships, Holloway was selected as coach, and served as a coach at the World University Games in 2019.

=== Olympians coached ===
Among Americans at the 2024 Olympics, Hollway coached American gold and bronze medalist Katharine Berkoff, as North Carolina's first female Olympian. He also coached NC State swimmer Ryan Held, both a 2016 and 2024 Olympic gold medalist in the 4x100 meter freestyle relay .

Among the many international athletes he coached at NC State who attended the Olympics, he trained Greek Olympian Andreas Vazaios who was competing in his fourth Olympics at Paris in 2024. He had coached Soren Dahl and Anton Ipsen of Denmark, and Simonas Bilis of Lithuania to the 2016 Rio de Jainero Olympics. At the 2020 Tokyo Olympics, he coached Alexander Norgaard of Denmark, Kacper Stokowski of Poland, Andrea Podmanikova of Slovakia, Sophie Hansson of Sweden, and Noe Ponti of Switzerland. Among international competitors at the 2024 Paris Olympics, Holloway coached Kaii Winkler of Germany, David Betlehem and Bettina Fabian of Hungary, Nyls Korstanje of the Netherlands, and Kacper Stokowski of Poland.

Holloway was married to Mary Mittendorf, an outstanding former swimmer at North Carolina state, who captured four top ten times in the university record book. They have four children, and have resided in Raleigh, North Carolina, while Braden coached at North Carolina State.

=== Honors ===
For his achievements as a high school swimmer, in 1997 Holloway was inducted into the Athletic Hall of Fame of Batan Rouge High School, having been a Louisiana State champion in two years, and an Honorable mention All American.

In 2000 while competing for North Carolina State, Holloway received the Willis Casey Award, as a Most Valuable Player in Men's Swimming and Diving.

In November 2023, Holloway was named the Distinguished Alumnus of the year by North Carolina State for his accomplishments as a Coach for the North Carolina State Swimming team since 2011, and his work in international coaching.

By 2024, Holloway had been named an Atlantic Coast Conference Coach of the year in ten years, 2013, 2015–2020, 2022, 2023, and 2024, and was named the ACC Women's Coach of the Year in 2017 and one succeeding year.
