= Ruwen Straub =

German swimmer

Personal information
- Nationality: German
- Born: 8 December 1993 (age 32)

Sport
- Sport: Swimming

Ruwen Straub (born 8 December 1993) is a German swimmer. He competed in the men's 1500 metre freestyle at the 2019 World Aquatics Championships.
