= Alexander Nørgaard =

Danish swimmer

Alexander Aslack Nørgaard
Personal information
- National team: Denmark
- Born: 15 March 2000 (age 26) Vedbæk, Rudersdal, Hovedstaden (DEN)

Sport
- Sport: Swimming
- Club: Sigma Swim Birkerød
- College team: North Carolina State University
- Coach: Braden Holloway (NCSU)
Medal record
Representing Denmark
European Junior Championships
Silver medal – second place	2018 Helsinki	1500 m freestyle

Alexander Nørgaard (born 15 March 2000) is a Danish swimmer who competed for North Carolina State University and represented Denmark in the 2020 Summer Olympics in Tokyo. He broke the Danish world record in the 1500-meter freestyle in July, 2019.

Alexander Norgaard was born 15 March 2000, in Denmark's Vedbæk, Rudersdal, and swam for Sigma Swim Bikerod.

== International competition ==
Norgaard competed in the men's 1500 metre freestyle at the 2019 World Aquatics Championships in Gwangju, South Korea. He qualified for the final of the men's 1500 freestyle final by recording a new Danish Record time of 14:47.75 in the preliminary heats, and placed eighth overall in the final, recording a time of 15:20.47. He previously won a silver medal in the 1500 meter event at the 2018 European Junior Championships in Helsinki, Finland.

In 2020, representing Sigma Swim, competed with the US National Team, as part of Knoxville, Tennessee's TYR Pro Swim Series, winning the 800 freestyle with a time of 7:59.63.

== North Carolina State University ==
Nørgaard attended North Carolina State University beginning in January 2022, where he was trained and managed primarily by Head Coach Braden Holloway, a former NC State All American swimmer. After announcing his intent to enroll in 2019, Nørgaard delayed his entrance due to the COVID virus. Considered one of the strongest in NC State history, Norgaard became part of an exceptional Freshman class that featured Americans Aiden Hayes, Arsenio Bustos, Sam Hoover, David Curtiss, and Garrett Boone. With considerable depth, the Freshman swimmers also included Noe Ponti, a Swiss Olympic bronze medalist.

A strong team that soon dominated at the conference level and was recognized at the national level, during Nørgaard's collegiate career, Coach Holloway led the North Carolina State men to a third successive title in the Atlantic Coast Conference and a fifth-place finish at the NCAA championships in the 2023–24 season. At the 2024 NCAA Championships in Indianapolis, the men's team set two American records, and received ten All American and ten honorable mention honorees. From 2022 to 2024, the North Carolina men won three consecutive ACC championships. Holloway was known for challenging his swimmers to perform pull-ups during their training.

== 2020 Olympics ==
After being selected with eight other swimmers for the Danish team, Alexander flew to Nagano, Japan for training camp.

Norgaard competed in the men's 800 and 1500 metre freestyle at the 2020 Summer Olympics in Tokyo. He was 19th among all competitors in the 800 meter freestyle, recording a time of 7:53.50 and placed 26th in the 1500 freestyle with a time of 15:28.70.
