= Cheng Long (swimmer) =

Chinese swimmer (born 2000)

Personal information
- Nationality: Chinese
- Born: 25 May 2000 (age 26)

Sport
- Sport: Swimming
Medal record
Men's swimming
Representing China
Junior Pan Pacific Championships
Gold medal – first place	2018 Suva	1500 m freestyle
Silver medal – second place	2018 Suva	800 m freestyle

Cheng Long (Chinese: 程龙; born 25 May 2000) is a Chinese swimmer. He competed in the men's 800 metre freestyle at the 2020 Summer Olympics.

At the 2018 Junior Pan Pacific Swimming Championships, in Suva, Fiji, Long won the gold medal in the 1500 metre freestyle with a time of 15:24.55 and the silver medal in the 800 metre freestyle with a time of 8:02.79.
