= Kirill Martynychev =

Russian swimmer

Personal information
- Native name: Кирилл Иванович Мартынычев
- Full name: Kirill Ivanovich Martynychev
- Born: 5 May 2002 (age 24) Saint Petersburg, Russia

Sport
- Sport: Swimming
- Strokes: Freestyle
Medal record
Men's swimming
Representing Russia
European Junior Championships
Gold medal – first place	2019 Kazan	1500 m freestyle

Kirill Ivanovich Martynychev (Russian: Кирилл Иванович Мартынычев; born 5 May 2002) is a Russian swimmer. He competed in the 2020 Summer Olympics.
