= Todd DeSorbo =

American swimming coach

Todd Desorbo
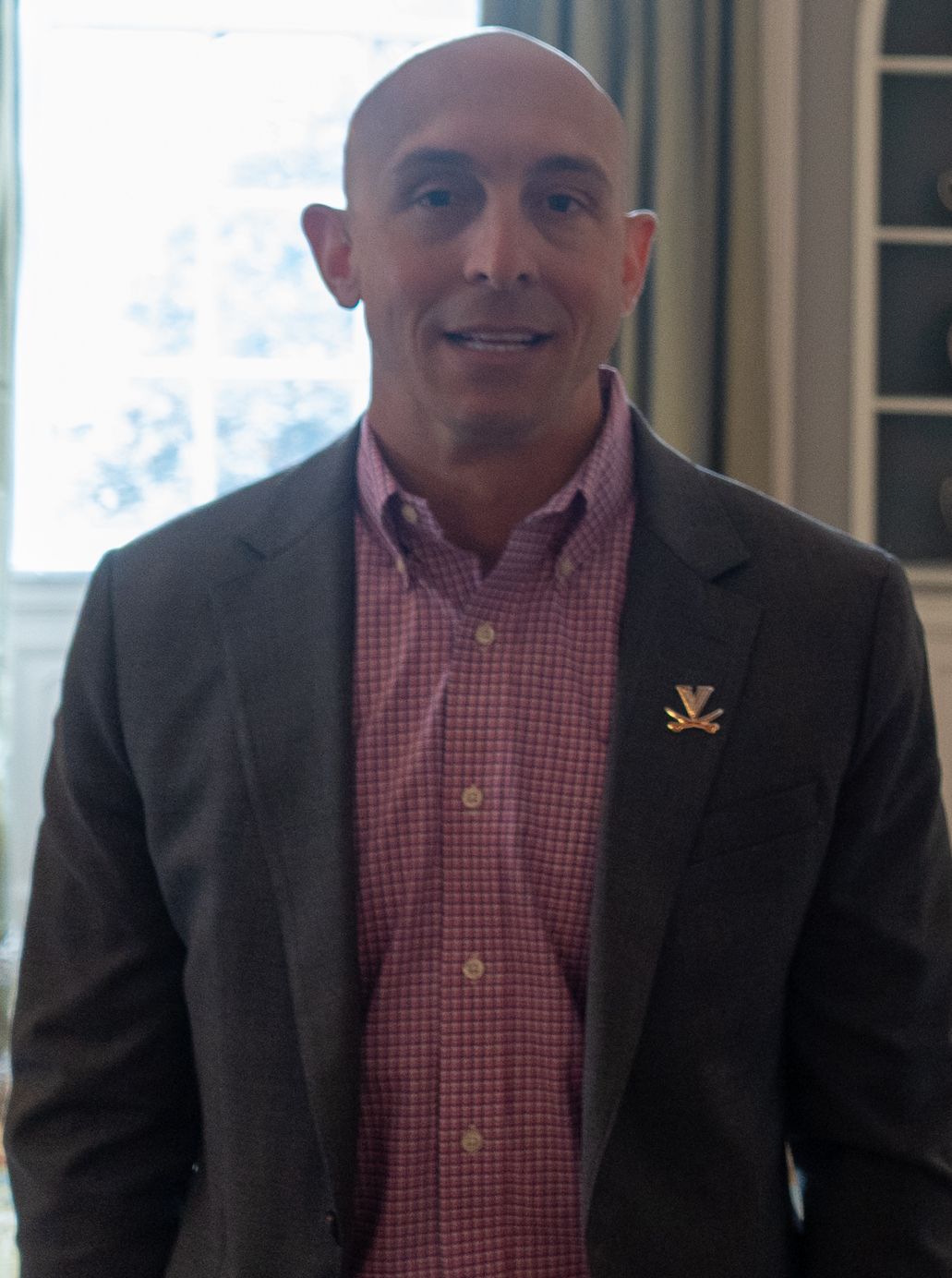
- DeSorbo in 2023

Current position
- Title: Head coach
- Team: University of Virginia
- Conference: ACC

Biographical details
- Born: circa 1977; Salisbury, North Carolina, U.S.
- Education: University of North Carolina Wilmington (UNCW)

Playing career
- 1995–1998: University of Kentucky; Coached by Gary Connelly
- 1998–1999: U. North Carolina Wilmington; 1999 Graduate; Coached by Scott Hammond
- Positions: Back stroke Individual Medley

Coaching career (HC unless noted)
- 2005–2007: Cape Fear Aquatic Club
- 2007–2011: University of North Carolina Wilmington (Assistant)
- 2011–2017: North Carolina State (associate head coach)
- 2017–present: University of Virginia
- 2021 (Tokyo): US Olympic Swim Team; Asst. Coach
- 2024 (Paris): US Olympic Swim Team women's head coach

Accomplishments and honors

Championships
- Women's ACC Championships: 2018, 2020, 2021, 2022, 2023, 2024, 2025; Women's NCAA Championships: 2021, 2022, 2023, 2024, 2025

Awards
- CSCAA Women’s Coach of the Year: 2021, 2022, 2023, 2024; ACC Women's Swim Coach of the Year: 2020, 2021, 2022, 2023, 2024

Todd DeSorbo (born 1977) has been the head coach of the Men and Women's Virginia Cavaliers Swim team at the University of Virginia since assuming the position in 2017, and in his initial eight years of coaching has led the women's team to seven ACC Championships and a nearly unprecedented five successive NCAA National titles. He formerly served as an associate coach at North Carolina State University from 2011 to 2017. He served as an assistant coach for the 2021 US Tokyo Summer Olympics Women's Swim Team, and in September 2023 was named as the head coach for the U.S. Olympic women's team for the 2024 Paris Olympics.

== Early swimming and education ==
DeSorbo is a native of Salisbury, North Carolina, born around 1977, and was swimming competitively by the age of ten. During his high school years, he was a standout swimmer for Salisbury High School, and Salisbury's Rowan Aquatic Club, where he was particularly proficient in backstroke, freestyle, and medley events. On August 11, 1990, swimming for the North Carolina Aquatic Club during the summer, at around twelve he swam with a 200 freestyle relay team that broke the National age group record with a 1:50.35 at the Southern Zone Championships in Orlando, Florida.

Swimming for Salisbury High at the State Championship meet at the University of North Carolina Chapel Hill's Koury Nadatorium on March 8, 1995, he won the 200-yard Individual Medley, one of his signature events, in 1:57.98 seconds, and the 100-yard freestyle in 48.33.2 seconds, helping Salisbury to come from behind and win the State Swimming Championships.

== College swimming, 1995–1999 ==
Beginning around the fall of 1995, he swam for University of Kentucky under Head Coach Gary Conelly, where he continued to show stroke diversity placing second in a 400 Medley IM, and winning a 200 Butterfly event in a meet against Southern Illinois in October 1997. After around three years swimming for University of Kentucky, he transferred to the University of North Carolina Wilmington for the 1998–1999 season. At the University of North Carolina State, he continued to swim in his senior year for Head Coach Scott Hammond.

In 1999, DeSorbo was named Coastal Athletic Association's (CAA) Championship Swimmer of the Meet as a UNC Wilmington Senior after winning titles in the 200 backstroke, and in the 200 and 400 individual medley. DeSorbo would set UNCW school records in the 200 and 400 individual medleys as well. His UNCW degrees are in accounting, earning his bachelor's in 1999, and his master's in 2000.

== Early swim coach career, 2005–2011 ==
Early in his career, DeSorbo took his first swim coaching position for the Cape Fear Aquatics Club in Wilmington, North Carolina, from 2005 to 2007, currently a year-round program associated with USA Swimming. He then served as an assistant swim coach at his alma mater, UNC Wilmington, from around 2007 to 2011.

== NC State associate head coach, 2011-2017 ==
DeSorbo held the high-profile position of North Carolina State's associate head swimming coach from 2011 to 2017, where he coached with Braden Holloway, a former All-American North Carolina State swimmer. DeSorbo held responsibilities for daily operations, as well as recruiting and training. As a former collegiate swimmer and Medley champion, he worked with sprinters, and in the development of skills, strategy, and goal setting. In his last year of coaching the team in 2017, the North Carolina Women won the ACC title.

In the 2016 Olympics in Rio, three of DeSorbo's swimmers, Soeren Dahl, Simonas Bilis, and sprinter Ryan Held competed or qualified. Most notably, Ryan Held helped lead the U.S. Men's team to a 4x100 relay Gold medal. Bilis was also a three-time top three finisher in the 50, 100, and 200 freestyle at the 2016 NCAA championships. Another top male swimmer he coached at NC State included USA National Champion Justin Ress and 2017 ACC Female Freshman of the Year, and 2016 Olympic Trial qualifier Ky-lee Perry. As a freshman in 2016–17, Ky-lee was a member of a 200-meter medley relay and an ACC title-winning 200 freestyle relay team that broke the NC State and conference records.

== University of Virginia head swim coach, 2017–present ==
After DeSorbo took the reins as head coach in 2017, the University of Virginia women's swim team won five straight NCAA Championships from 2021 to 2025. In DeSorbo's first year, the Women's team were Atlantic Coast Conference (ACC) Champions. The Women won again in 2020 and each year since.

Virginia has gained national recognition with DeSorbo at the helm and has become the first Women's team in the ACC to ever win a National NCAA title. Virginia's women have won repeated NCAA Championships (2021, 2022, 2023, 2024, & 2025) and in three consecutive years the men's team have improved to top 10 finishes. During the first four years of Desorbo's tenure, Virginia swimmers set 15 women's swimming school records, and 15 men’s swimming school records. He has signed a contract extension to coach at least through the 2026–2027 season.

== Coaching style ==
In 2020, DeSorbo told an interviewer he is not an advocate of long warm up sets and does not believe in assigning extremely long yardage in practices as his primary goal for his Division 1 teams at Virginia. He assigns yardage according to how the team looks on a given day, and generally favors workout yardage within a threshold of 4000–5000 meters or around 2.8–3.0 miles, although the yardage is in reference to his women's team. This estimate may not apply when he is ramping up his training or preparing for Olympic or World competition. Virginia practices are often preceded by weights or dryland training, which reduces the need for long warm-ups.

== U.S. Olympic, international coaching ==
=== 2O21 Olympics assistant coach ===
In 2021, DeSorbo served as an assistant coach for the US Swimming team in the Tokyo Olympics held that summer. They had been cancelled in 2020 due to the COVID-19 Pandemic.

=== 2022 World Championships women's head coach ===
DeSorbo was named as head coach for the 2022 FINA World Championships Women's team held in Budapest, Hungary, in June and July. At the World's, American swimmers earned 45 medals, the most ever given to any team at the International championship. It was an impressive record count that exceeded the previous American record of 38, and may have been a factor in his selection to be U.S. Olympic Women's swim coach for 2024.

=== 2024 Olympics women's head coach ===
In September 2023, USA Swimming Managing Director, Lindsay Mintenko named DeSorbo head coach for the US Women's team at the 2024 Summer Olympics to be held in Paris, France, with Anthony Nesty to be men's head coach.

== Personal life ==
Todd lives in Charlottesville, Virginia, with his wife, Lauren Suggs, and their two children.

He has 3 siblings, one brother, Andrew DeSorbo and 2 sisters, Courtney and Tara

== Awards and honors ==
- Golden Goggle Awards, Coach of the Year: 2024, 2025
