= Anton Ipsen =

Danish swimmer (born 1994)

Personal information
- Full name: Anton Ørskov Ipsen
- National team: Denmark
- Born: 4 September 1994 (age 32) Berlin, Germany
- Height: 186 cm (6 ft 1 in)
- Weight: 74 kg (163 lb)

Sport
- Sport: Swimming
- Strokes: Freestyle
- Club: Sigma Swim Birkerod; Bikerod, Denmark
- College team: North Carolina State University
- Coach: Todd DeSorbo (NCSU); Braden Holloway (NCSU)
Medal record
Representing the NC State Wolfpack
Event	1st	2nd	3rd
NCAA Championships	1	0	1
Total	1	0	1
By race
Event	1st	2nd	3rd
1650 y freestyle	1	0	0
500 y freestyle	0	0	1
Total	1	0	1
NCAA Championships
Gold medal – first place	2018 Minneapolis	1650 y freestyle
Bronze medal – third place	2018 Minneapolis	500 y freestyle

Anton Ørskov Ipsen (born 4 September 1994) is a Danish former swimmer specializing in distance events, who swam for North Carolina State University and competed for Denmark in the 400, 1500 and 1800 meter events in the 2016 Rio de Janeiro and 2020 Tokyo Summer Olympics. Ipsen finished 20th and 18th respectively at those events.

Ipsen was born in Berlin, Germany, on 4 September 1994, and swam for Sigma Swim Birkerod, in Bikerod, Denmark. He attended Bikerod Gymnasium for his high school education.

== North Carolina State ==
Ispen competed for North Carolina State University where he trained and competed under Coaches Todd DeSorbo and Braden Holloway. He majored in industrial engineering at NC State, graduating around 2018. He was named Danish swimmer of the year in 2016 and NC State's Scholar-Athlete of the Year in 2017. He competed in three events at the 2019 World Aquatics Championships held in Gwangju, South Korea.

In 2014, in his first year as a swimmer, he owned university records in the 1,650 and 500 and earned the title of the ACC Freshman of the Year. In his final year of eligibility as a senior in 2017–2018, he won his initial NCAA Championship title, competing in the 1650-yard event. The race was close until the 1100 meter mark when Ipsen went ahead of Felix Auboeck of Michigan. Ipsen won the event by a five-second margin, setting a time of 14:24.43, and also finished 11th in the 400 IM recording a 3:39.71 for his time.

To summarize his collegiate accomplishments during his swimming eligibility from 2015 to 2018, he was an All American at NCSU ten times, primarily in the 500 and 1650 freestyle, and was a nine-time champion in the Atlantic Coast Conference in the same events as well as the 400 IM in 2018. Also excelling in the classroom, he made the All-ACC Academic Team all four years in 2015, 2016, 2017, and 2018 and made Scholar Athlete of the Year for the ACC Conference in both 2017 and 2018.

== 2016, 2020 Olympics ==
Ipsen competed in the men's 400 metre and men's 1500 metre events at the 2016 Summer Olympics in Rio de Janeiro. He finished the 1,500 meter 18th overall with a personal best time of 15:05.91. He also swam the 400 meter freestyle, finishing 20th in 3:48.31. Ipsen was one of five NC State swimmers at the Games.

At the 2020 Olympics in Tokyo, he competed in the 800 meter freestyle finishing 21st with a time of 7:54.98, and competed in the 1500 meter freestyle finishing 14th overall with a time of 15:01.58.

In 2019, he swam for the Cali Condors ISL, a professional international swimming team with Jason Lesak as general manager.
