= Aleksandr Egorov (swimmer) =

Russian swimmer

Personal information
- Nationality: Russia
- Born: 19 August 2001 (age 23); Cheboksary, Russia

Sport
- Sport: Swimming

Aleksandr Egorov (born 19 August 2001) is a Russian swimmer. He competed in the 2020 Summer Olympics.
