= Czech Republic at the 2020 Summer Olympics =

- IOC code: CZE
- NOC: Czech Olympic Committee
- Website: www.olympic.cz (in Czech and English)

in Tokyo, Japan July 23, 2021 – August 8, 2021
- Competitors: 115 in 22 sports
- Flag bearers (opening): Petra Kvitová; Tomáš Satoranský
- Flag bearer (closing): Jakub Vadlejch
- Medals Ranked 18th: Gold 4 Silver 4 Bronze 3 Total 11

Summer Olympics appearances (overview)
- 1996; 2000; 2004; 2008; 2012; 2016; 2020; 2024; 2028

Other related appearances
- Bohemia (1900–1912); Czechoslovakia (1924–1992)

The Czech Republic competed at the 2020 Summer Olympics in Tokyo. Originally scheduled to take place from 24 July to 9 August 2020, the Games were postponed to 23 July to 8 August 2021, because of the COVID-19 pandemic. It was the nation's seventh consecutive appearance at the Summer Olympics after splitting from the former Czechoslovakia.

Several team members, including table tennis player Pavel Širuček, beach volleyball players Ondřej Perušič and Markéta Sluková and road cyclist Michal Schlegel, and delegation members were tested positive for COVID-19 in Tokyo. The anti-epidemic measures were not followed on a charter flight of the Czech team and delegation, the case positivity of unvaccinated tennis doctor (despite wide vaccine availability in the Czech Republic) have caused most controversies.

For the Czech Republic, these were the most successful Olympic Games in terms of medals. Czech athletes broke the previous record from the Olympics in 1996 and 2012 by one silver medal. Josef Dostál became most decorated Summer olympic's athlete in Czech republic's history with 4 medals (1 silver, 3 bronze).

== Medalists ==
Medal	Name	Sport	Event	Date
Gold	Jiří Lipták	Shooting	Men's trap	29 July
Gold	Jiří Prskavec	Canoeing	Men's slalom K-1	30 July
Gold	Lukáš Krpálek	Judo	Men's +100 kg	30 July
Gold	Barbora Krejčíková; Kateřina Siniaková	Tennis	Women's doubles	1 August
Silver	Lukáš Rohan	Canoeing	Men's slalom C-1	26 July
Silver	David Kostelecký	Shooting	Men's trap	29 July
Silver	Markéta Vondroušová	Tennis	Women's Singles	31 July
Silver	Jakub Vadlejch	Athletics	Men's javelin throw	7 August
Bronze	Alexander Choupenitch	Fencing	Men's foil	26 July
Bronze	Josef Dostál; Radek Šlouf	Canoeing	Men's K-2 1000 metres	5 August
Bronze	Vítězslav Veselý	Athletics	Men's javelin throw	7 August

Medals by sport
Sport	1st place, gold medalist(s)	2nd place, silver medalist(s)	3rd place, bronze medalist(s)	Total
Athletics	0	1	1	2
Canoeing	1	1	1	3
Fencing	0	0	1	1
Judo	1	0	0	1
Shooting	1	1	0	2
Tennis	1	1	0	2
Total	4	4	3	11

Medals by date
Day	Date	1st place, gold medalist(s)	2nd place, silver medalist(s)	3rd place, bronze medalist(s)	Total
3	July 26	0	1	1	2
6	July 29	1	1	0	2
7	July 30	2	0	0	2
8	July 31	0	1	0	1
9	August 1	1	0	0	1
13	August 5	0	0	1	1
15	August 7	0	1	1	2
Total		4	4	3	11

Medals by gender
Gender	1st place, gold medalist(s)	2nd place, silver medalist(s)	3rd place, bronze medalist(s)	Total	Percentage
Male	3	3	3	9	81.81%
Female	1	1	0	2	18.18%
Mixed	0	0	0	0	0.00%
Total	1	0	1	2	100%

Multiple medalists
Name	Sport	1st place, gold medalist(s)	2nd place, silver medalist(s)	3rd place, bronze medalist(s)	Total
—N/a	—N/a	0	0	0	0

== Competitors ==
The following is the list of number of competitors participating in the Games:

Sport	Men	Women	Total
Archery	0	1	1
Athletics	14	14	28
Basketball	12	0	12
Canoeing	6	2	8
Cycling	5	2	7
Equestrian	5	1	6
Fencing	2	0	2
Golf	1	1	2
Gymnastics	1	1	2
Judo	2	0	2
Modern pentathlon	2	0	2
Rowing	5	2	7
Sailing	1	0	1
Shooting	6	2	8
Sport climbing	1	0	1
Swimming	4	5	9
Table Tennis	2	1	3
Tennis	1	5	6
Triathlon	0	2	2
Volleyball	2	2	4
Weightlifting	1	0	1
Wrestling	1	0	1
Total	74	41	115

== Archery ==
One Czech Republic archer directly qualified for the women's individual recurve at the Games by reaching the semifinal stage and obtaining one of five available spots at the 2021 Final Qualification Tournament in Paris, France.

Athlete	Event	Ranking round		Round of 64	Round of 32	Round of 16	Quarterfinals	Semifinals	Final / BM	
Athlete	Event	Score	Seed	Opposition Score	Opposition Score	Opposition Score	Opposition Score	Opposition Score	Opposition Score	Rank
Marie Horáčková	Women's individual	636	34	Nakamura (JPN); L 2–6	Did not advance					

== Athletics ==
Czech athletes further achieved the entry standards, either by qualifying time or by world ranking, in the following track and field events (up to a maximum of 3 athletes in each event):

Key

- Note–Ranks given for track events are within the athlete's heat only
- Q = Qualified for the next round
- q = Qualified for the next round as a fastest loser or, in field events, by position without achieving the qualifying target
- NR = National record
- N/A = Round not applicable for the event
- Bye = Athlete not required to compete in round

Track & road events
Men

Athlete	Event	Heat		Semifinal		Final	
Athlete	Event	Time	Rank	Time	Rank	Time	Rank
Jan Jirka	200 m	DSQ		Did not advance			
Pavel Maslák	400 m	47.01	7	Did not advance			
Vít Müller	400 m hurdles	49.59	5 q	49.69	8	Did not advance	
Michal Desenský; Pavel Maslák; Patrik Šorm; Vít Müller	4 × 400 m relay	3:03.61	7	—N/a		Did not advance	
Lukáš Gdula	50 km walk	—N/a				4:33:06	46
Vít Hlaváč	50 km walk	—N/a				4:15:40	43

Women

Athlete	Event	Heat		Semifinal		Final	
Athlete	Event	Time	Rank	Time	Rank	Time	Rank
Barbora Malíková	400 m	52.83	6	Did not advance			
Lada Vondrová	400 m	51.14 PB	3 Q	51.62	8	Did not advance	
Kristiina Mäki	1500 m	4:04.55	6 Q	4:01.23 NR	7 q	4:11.76	13
Diana Mezuliáníková	1500 m	4:05.49	6 Q	4:03.70 PB	9	Did not advance	
Simona Vrzalová	1500 m	4:19.46	13	Did not advance			
Tereza Hrochová	Marathon	—N/a				2:42:25	58
Marcela Joglová	Marathon	—N/a				2:39:29	52
Eva Vrabcová Nývltová	Marathon	—N/a				DNF	
Tereza Ďurdiaková	20 km walk	—N/a				1:36:58	30

Field events
Men

Athlete	Event	Qualification		Final	
Athlete	Event	Distance	Position	Distance	Position
Tomáš Staněk	Shot put	20.47	17	Did not advance	
Jakub Vadlejch	Javelin throw	84.93	4 Q	86.67 SB	2nd place, silver medalist(s)
Vítězslav Veselý	Javelin throw	83.04	8 Q	85.44 SB	3rd place, bronze medalist(s)

Women

Athlete	Event	Qualification		Final	
Athlete	Event	Distance	Position	Distance	Position
Romana Maláčová	Pole vault	4.40	23	Did not advance	
Markéta Červenková	Shot put	17.33	24	Did not advance	
Nikola Ogrodníková	Javelin throw	60.03	16	Did not advance	
Irena Gillarová	Javelin throw	59.16	19	Did not advance	
Barbora Špotáková	Javelin throw	60.52	14	Did not advance	

Combined events - Men's decathlon

Athlete	Event	100 m	LJ	SP	HJ	400 m	110H	DT	PV	JT	1500 m	Total	Rank
Adam Sebastian Helcelet	Result	11.06	7.16	14.99	1.96	49.41	14.35	45.40	4.60	61.54	4:44.74	8004	16
Adam Sebastian Helcelet	Points	847	852	789	767	842	930	775	790	761	651	8004	16
Jiří Sýkora	Result	11.18	7.03	14.63	1.90	48.89	14.48	49.90	4.60	63.73	4:54.97	7943	17
Jiří Sýkora	Points	821	821	767	714	866	913	868	790	794	589	7943	17

== Basketball ==
=== Men's tournament ===
The Czech Republic men's basketball team qualified for the Olympics by winning the Olympic Qualifying Tournament in Victoria.

Team roster

The roster was announced on 8 July 2021.

Czech Republic men's national basketball team roster
Players
Coaches

Pos.	No.	Name	Age – Date of birth	Height	Club	Ctr.
PF	1	Patrik Auda	31 – 29 August 1989	2.06 m (6 ft 9 in)	Yokohama B-Corsairs	(Japan)
PG	4	Tomáš Vyoral	28 – 28 September 1992	1.90 m (6 ft 3 in)	Pardubice	(Czech Republic)
PG	8	Tomáš Satoranský	29 – 30 October 1991	2.01 m (6 ft 7 in)	Chicago Bulls	(United States)
F	11	Blake Schilb	37 – 23 December 1983	1.99 m (6 ft 6 in)	USK Praha	(Czech Republic)
C	12	Ondřej Balvín	28 – 20 September 1992	2.17 m (7 ft 1 in)	Bilbao	(Spain)
PG	13	Jakub Šiřina	33 – 21 November 1987	1.86 m (6 ft 1 in)	Opava	(Czech Republic)
PF	15	Martin Peterka	26 – 12 January 1995	2.03 m (6 ft 8 in)	Braunschweig	(Germany)
F	17	Jaromír Bohačík	29 – 26 May 1992	1.97 m (6 ft 6 in)	Strasbourg	(France)
PG	19	Ondřej Sehnal	23 – 10 October 1997	1.90 m (6 ft 3 in)	Praha	(Czech Republic)
SF	23	Lukáš Palyza	31 – 10 November 1989	2.03 m (6 ft 8 in)	Nymburk	(Czech Republic)
C	24	Jan Veselý	31 – 24 April 1990	2.13 m (7 ft 0 in)	Fenerbahçe	(Turkey)
SG	25	David Jelínek	30 – 7 September 1990	1.97 m (6 ft 6 in)	Andorra	(Spain)

Head coach

- (Israel) Ronen Ginzburg

Assistant coach(es)

- (Czech Republic) Petr Czudek
- (Czech Republic) Jan Pospíšil

Legend

- Club – describes last
  club before the competition
- Age – describes age
  on 25 July 2021

Group play

Pos	Team	Pld	W	L	PF	PA	PD	Pts	Qualification
1	France	3	3	0	259	215	+44	6	Quarterfinals
2	United States	3	2	1	315	233	+82	5	Quarterfinals
3	Czech Republic	3	1	2	245	294	−49	4	
4	Iran	3	0	3	206	283	−77	3	

Source: TOCOG and FIBA
Rules for classification: 1) classification points; 2) head-to-head results; 3) head-to-head game points difference; 4) head-to-head number of game points scored.

25 July 2021
10:00
v

Boxscore

Iran	78–84	Czech Republic
Scoring by quarter: 19–25, 11–21, 16–21, 32–17
Pts: Yakhchali 23; Rebs: Haddadi 10; Asts: Jamshidi 7		Pts: Auda 16; Rebs: Balvín, Satoranský 8 Asts: Satoranský 8

Saitama Super Arena, Saitama
Referees: Matthew Kallio (CAN), Scott Beker (AUS), Yener Yılmaz (TUR)

28 July 2021
21:00
v

Boxscore

Czech Republic	77–97	France
Scoring by quarter: 28–22, 12–29, 16–26, 21–20
Pts: Veselý 19; Rebs: Balvín 8 Asts: Satoranský 9		Pts: Fournier 21; Rebs: Gobert 10; Asts: De Colo 8

Saitama Super Arena, Saitama
Referees: Juan Fernández (ARG), Manuel Mazzoni (ITA), Leandro Lezcano (ARG)

31 July 2021
21:00
v

Boxscore

United States	119–84	Czech Republic
Scoring by quarter: 18–25, 29–18, 35–17, 37–24
Pts: Tatum 27; Rebs: Durant 8 Asts: Durant 6		Pts: Schilb 17; Rebs: Satoranský 6 Asts: Satoranský 8

Saitama Super Arena, Saitama
Referees: Aleksandar Glišić (SRB), Manuel Mazzoni (ITA), Maripier Malo (CAN)

== Canoeing ==
=== Slalom ===
Czech canoeists qualified boats in all four classes for the Games through the 2019 ICF Canoe Slalom World Championships in La Seu d'Urgell, Spain.

Athlete	Event	Preliminary						Semifinal		Final	
Athlete	Event	Run 1	Rank	Run 2	Rank	Best	Rank	Time	Rank	Time	Rank
Lukáš Rohan	Men's C-1	103.98	9	102.15	6	102.15	8 Q	103.68	4 Q	101.96	2nd place, silver medalist(s)
Jiří Prskavec	Men's K-1	92.57	3	91.71	4	91.71	4 Q	94.29	1 Q	91.63	1st place, gold medalist(s)
Tereza Fišerová	Women's C-1	110.45	3	109.16	3	109.16	3 Q	113.23	2	120.99	6
Kateřina Minařík Kudějová	Women's K-1	107.87	4	106.41	6	106.41	6 Q	116.15	15	Did not advance	

=== Sprint ===
Czech canoeists qualified four boats in each of the following distances for the Games through the 2019 ICF Canoe Sprint World Championships in Szeged, Hungary.

Athlete	Event	Heats		Quarterfinals		Semifinals		Final	
Athlete	Event	Time	Rank	Time	Rank	Time	Rank	Time	Rank
Martin Fuksa	Men's C-1 1000 m	4:01.620	2 SF	Bye		4:04.220	3	4:08.755	5
Petr Fuksa	Men's C-1 1000 m	4:14.482	3 QF	4:14.476	4	Did not advance			
Josef Dostál	Men's K-1 1000 m	3:37.342	1 SF	Bye		3:25.387	2 Q	3:26.610	5
Martin Fuksa; Petr Fuksa	Men's C-2 1000 m	3:53.056	3 QF	3:50.635	2 SF	3:28.927	5 FB	3:31.240	10
Josef Dostál; Radek Šlouf	Men's K-2 1000 m	3:13.425	2 SF	Bye		3:18.240	4 FA	3:16.106	3rd place, bronze medalist(s)

Qualification Legend: FA = Qualify to final (medal); FB = Qualify to final B (non-medal)

== Cycling ==
=== Road ===
Czech Republic entered a squad of four riders (three men and one woman) to compete in their respective Olympic road races, by virtue of their top 50 national finish (for men) and her top 100 individual finish (for women) in the UCI World Ranking.

Athlete	Event	Time	Rank
Michael Kukrle	Men's road race	6:15:38	36
Michael Kukrle	Men's time trial	1:00:41.55	26
Michal Schlegel	Men's road race	Did not start	
Zdeněk Štybar	Men's road race	Did not finish	
Tereza Neumanová	Women's road race	3:59:47	33

=== Track ===
Following the completion of the 2020 UCI Track Cycling World Championships, Czech Republic entered one rider to compete in the men's sprint and keirin based on his final individual UCI Olympic rankings.

Sprint

Athlete	Event	Qualification		Round 1	Repechage 1	Round 2	Repechage 2	Round 3	Repechage 3	Quarterfinals	Semifinals	Final	
Athlete	Event	Time Speed (km/h)	Rank	Opposition Time Speed (km/h)	Opposition Time Speed (km/h)	Opposition Time Speed (km/h)	Opposition Time Speed (km/h)	Opposition Time Speed (km/h)	Opposition Time Speed (km/h)	Opposition Time Speed (km/h)	Opposition Time Speed (km/h)	Opposition Time Speed (km/h)	Rank
Tomáš Bábek	Men's sprint	9.856; 73.052	28	Did not advance									

Keirin

Athlete	Event	Round 1	Repechage	Quarterfinals	Semifinals	Final
Athlete	Event	Rank	Rank	Rank	Rank	Rank
Tomáš Bábek	Men's keirin	4 R	4	Did not advance		

=== Mountain biking ===
Czech Republic qualified two mountain bikers; one male and one female, based on the UCI Olympic Mountain Biking rankings.

Athlete	Event	Time	Rank
Ondřej Cink	Men's cross-country	Did not finish	
Jitka Čábelická	Women's cross-country	1:25:00	22

== Equestrian ==
Czech Republic entered two eventing riders into the Olympic equestrian competition by securing the first and fifth of six available slots, respectively, outside the group and continental selection, in the individual FEI Olympic rankings. Meanwhile, a squad of three jumping riders was added to the Czech roster by accepting a forfeited spot from Ukraine, as the next highest-ranked team, not yet qualified, at the International Equestrian Federation (FEI)-designated Olympic qualifier for the second batch of Group C (Central and Eastern Europe) in Budapest.

=== Eventing ===
Athlete	Horse	Event	Dressage		Cross-country			Jumping						Total	
Athlete	Horse	Event	Dressage		Cross-country			Qualifier			Final			Total	
Athlete	Horse	Event	Penalties	Rank	Penalties	Total	Rank	Penalties	Total	Rank	Penalties	Total	Rank	Penalties	Rank
Miloslav Příhoda Jr.	Ferreolus Lat	Individual	33.80	35	30.60	64.40	36	4.00	68.40	33	Did not advance				
Miroslav Trunda	Shutterflyke	Individual	46.10	60	66.00	112.10	49	13.60	101.70	39	Did not advance				

=== Jumping ===
Athlete	Horse	Event	Qualification		Final		
Athlete	Horse	Event	Penalties	Rank	Penalties	Time	Rank
Anna Kellnerová	Catch Me If You Can Old	Individual	12	=55	Did not advance		
Aleš Opatrný	Forewer	Individual	4	=31	Did not advance		
Kamil Papoušek	Warness	Individual	Retired		Did not advance		
Anna Kellnerová; Aleš Opatrný; Ondřej Zvára	Catch Me If You Can; Forewer; Cento Lano	Team	45	15	Did not advance		

== Fencing ==
Czech Republic entered two fencers into the Olympic competition. Jakub Jurka (men's épée) and Rio 2016 Olympian Alexander Choupenitch (men's foil) claimed the fencing spots on the Czech roster as the sole winners of their respective individual events at the European Zonal Qualifier in Madrid, Spain.

Athlete	Event	Round of 64	Round of 32	Round of 16	Quarterfinal	Semifinal	Final / BM	
Athlete	Event	Opposition Score	Opposition Score	Opposition Score	Opposition Score	Opposition Score	Opposition Score	Rank
Jakub Jurka	Men's épée	Bye	Minobe (JPN); L 14–15	Did not advance				
Alexander Choupenitch	Men's foil	Bye	Llavador (ESP); W 15–11	Joppich (GER); W 15–13	Hamza (EGY); W 15–9	Cheung K-l (HKG); L 10–15	Shikine (JPN); W 15–8	3rd place, bronze medalist(s)

== Golf ==
Czech Republic entered one male and one female golfer into the Olympic tournament.

Athlete	Event	Round 1	Round 2	Round 3	Round 4	Total		
Athlete	Event	Score	Score	Score	Score	Score	Par	Rank
Ondřej Lieser	Men's	72	77	73	72	294	+10	60
Klára Spilková	Women's	69	70	71	69	279	−5	=23

== Gymnastics ==
=== Artistic ===
Czech Republic entered two artistic gymnast into the Olympic competition. Aneta Holasová booked a spot in the women's individual all-around and apparatus events, by finishing eleventh out of the twenty gymnasts eligible for qualification at the 2019 World Championships in Stuttgart, Germany.

Men

Athlete	Event	Qualification								Final							
Athlete	Event	Apparatus						Total	Rank	Apparatus						Total	Rank
Athlete	Event	F	PH	R	V	PB	HB	Total	Rank	F	PH	R	V	PB	HB	Total	Rank
David Jessen	All-around	13.466	12.333	12.566	12.333	13.633	11.000	75.331	57	Did not advance							

Women

Athlete	Event	Qualification						Final					
Athlete	Event	Apparatus				Total	Rank	Apparatus				Total	Rank
Athlete	Event	V	UB	BB	F	Total	Rank	V	UB	BB	F	Total	Rank
Aneta Holasová	All-around	12.566	11.533	11.933	11.100	47.132	73	Did not advance					

== Judo ==
Czech Republic entered two male judoka into the Olympic tournament based on the International Judo Federation Olympics Individual Ranking.

Athlete	Event	Round of 32	Round of 16	Quarterfinals	Semifinals	Repechage	Final / BM	
Athlete	Event	Opposition Result	Opposition Result	Opposition Result	Opposition Result	Opposition Result	Opposition Result	Rank
David Klammert	Men's −90 kg	Kochman (ISR); L 00–10	Did not advance					
Lukáš Krpálek	Men's +100 kg	Bye	Mahjoub (EOR); W 11–00	Oltiboev (UZB); W 01–00	Harasawa (JPN); W 01–00	Bye	Tushishvili (GEO); W 10–00	1st place, gold medalist(s)

== Modern pentathlon ==
Czech athletes qualified for the following spots in the modern pentathlon at the Games. Martin Vlach secured his selection in the men's event with a bronze-medal finish and third among those eligible for Olympic qualification at the 2019 European Championships in Bath, England.

Athlete	Event	Fencing (épée one touch)				Swimming (200 m freestyle)			Riding (show jumping)			Combined: shooting/running (10 m air pistol)/(3200 m)			Total points	Final rank
Athlete	Event	RR	BR	Rank	MP points	Time	Rank	MP points	Penalties	Rank	MP points	Time	Rank	MP Points	Total points	Final rank
Jan Kuf	Men's	23–12	0	6	238	2:02.32	16	306	6	5	294	11:23.76	19	617	1455	8
Martin Vlach	Men's	16–19	0	22	196	2:07.19	32	296	0	3	300	10:30.13	1	670	1462	5

== Rowing ==
Czech Republic qualified three boats for each of the following rowing classes into the Olympic regatta. Rowing crews in the men's single sculls and women's double sculls confirmed Olympic places for their boats at the 2019 FISA World Championships in Ottensheim, Austria. Meanwhile, two more crews (men's double sculls and men's lightweight double sculls) were added to the Czech roster with their top-two finish at the 2021 FISA Final Qualification Regatta in Lucerne, Switzerland.

Men

Athlete	Event	Heats		Repechage		Quarterfinals		Semifinals		Final	
Athlete	Event	Time	Rank	Time	Rank	Time	Rank	Time	Rank	Time	Rank
Jan Fleissner	Single sculls	7:16.56	4 R	7:29.90	1 QF	7:37.01	5 SC/D	6:59.61	3 FC	7:02.93	16
Jan Cincibuch; Jakub Podrazil	Double sculls	6:41.75	5 R	6:32.86	4	—N/a		Did not advance			
Jiří Šimánek; Miroslav Vraštil Jr.	Lightweight double sculls	6:28.10	2 SA/B	Bye		—N/a		6:11.88	2 FA	6:16.42	4

Women

Athlete	Event	Heats		Repechage		Semifinals		Final	
Athlete	Event	Time	Rank	Time	Rank	Time	Rank	Time	Rank
Lenka Antošová; Kristýna Fleissnerová	Double sculls	7:05.56	5 R	7:16.96	3 SA/B	7:24.22	5 FB	6:59.19	10

Qualification Legend: FA=Final A (medal); FB=Final B (non-medal); FC=Final C (non-medal); FD=Final D (non-medal); FE=Final E (non-medal); FF=Final F (non-medal); SA/B=Semifinals A/B; SC/D=Semifinals C/D; SE/F=Semifinals E/F; QF=Quarterfinals; R=Repechage

== Sailing ==
Czech sailors qualified one boat in each of the following classes through the class-associated World Championships and the continental regattas.

Athlete	Event	Race													Net points	Final rank
Athlete	Event	1	2	3	4	5	6	7	8	9	10	11	12	M*	Net points	Final rank
Karel Lavický	Men's RS:X	20	25	22	23	~~26~~	26	19	16	21	17	17	19	EL	225	22

M = Medal race; EL = Eliminated – did not advance into the medal race

== Shooting ==
Czech shooters achieved quota places for the following events by virtue of their best finishes at the 2018 ISSF World Championships, the 2019 ISSF World Cup series, European Championships or Games, and European Qualifying Tournament, as long as they obtained a minimum qualifying score (MQS) by 31 May 2020.

Men

Athlete	Event	Qualification		Final	
Athlete	Event	Points	Rank	Points	Rank
David Hrčkulák	10 m air rifle	625.7	19	Did not advance	
David Kostelecký	Trap	123	4 Q	43+6	2nd place, silver medalist(s)
Jiří Lipták	Trap	124	1 Q	43+7	1st place, gold medalist(s)
Petr Nymburský	50 m rifle 3 positions	1169	17	Did not advance	
Jiří Přívratský	10 m air rifle	626.8	14	Did not advance	
Jiří Přívratský	50 m rifle 3 positions	1169	16	Did not advance	
Jakub Tomeček	Skeet	122	7	Did not advance	

Women

Athlete	Event	Qualification		Final	
Athlete	Event	Points	Rank	Points	Rank
Nikola Šarounová	10 m air rifle	618.4	41	Did not advance	
Nikola Šarounová	50 m rifle 3 positions	1161	24	Did not advance	
Barbora Šumová	Skeet	118	14	Did not advance	

Mixed

Athlete	Event	Qualification		Semifinal		Final / BM	
Athlete	Event	Points	Rank	Points	Rank	Points	Rank
David Hrčkulák; Nikola Šarounová	10 m air rifle team	620.6	25	Did not advance			

== Sport climbing ==
Czech Republic entered one sport climber into the Olympic tournament. Multiple bouldering and lead world champion Adam Ondra qualified directly for the men's combined event, by advancing to the final and securing the first of the six provisional berths at the IFSC World Olympic Qualifying Event in Toulouse, France.

Athlete	Event	Qualification									Final								
Athlete	Event	Speed		Boulder		Lead			Total	Rank	Speed		Boulder		Lead			Total	Rank
Athlete	Event	Best	Place	Result	Place	Hold	Time	Place	Total	Rank	Best	Place	Result	Place	Hold	Time	Place	Total	Rank
Adam Ondra	Men's	7.46	18	2T3z 7 11	3	39+	—	4	216.00	5 Q	6.86	4	1T2z 2 2	6	42+	—	2	48	6

== Swimming ==
Czech swimmers further achieved qualifying standards in the following events (up to a maximum of 2 swimmers in each event at the Olympic Qualifying Time (OQT), and potentially 1 at the Olympic Selection Time (OST)):

Men

Athlete	Event	Heat		Semifinal		Final	
Athlete	Event	Time	Rank	Time	Rank	Time	Rank
Jan Čejka	100 m backstroke	54.69	30	Did not advance			
Jan Čejka	200 m backstroke	1:58.02	18	Did not advance			
Matěj Kozubek	10 km open water	—N/a				2:01:52.1	24
Jan Micka	800 m freestyle	7:59.04	28	—N/a		Did not advance	
Jan Micka	1500 m freestyle	15:17.71	23	—N/a		Did not advance	
Jan Šefl	100 m butterfly	52.52	=37	Did not advance			

Women

Athlete	Event	Heat		Semifinal		Final	
Athlete	Event	Time	Rank	Time	Rank	Time	Rank
Kristýna Horská	200 m breaststroke	2:25.03	19	Did not advance			
Kristýna Horská	200 m individual medley	2:12.21	16 Q	2:12.85	16	Did not advance	
Simona Kubová	100 m backstroke	1:01.35	27	Did not advance			
Simona Kubová	200 m backstroke	2:15.81	25	Did not advance			
Barbora Seemanová	50 m freestyle	24.92	21	Did not advance			
Barbora Seemanová	100 m freestyle	53.98	21	Did not advance			
Barbora Seemanová	200 m freestyle	1:56.38	7 Q	1:56.14	5 Q	1:55.45	6
Anika Apostalon; Kristýna Horská; Barbora Janíčková; Barbora Seemanová	4 × 100 m freestyle relay	3:42.40	14	—N/a		Did not advance	

== Table tennis ==
Czech Republic entered three athletes into the table tennis competition at the Games. Rio 2016 Olympian Lubomír Jančařík scored a first-match final triumph to book one of the four available places in the men's singles at the 2021 ITTF World Qualification Tournament in Doha, Qatar. Meanwhile, Pavel Širuček reserved the last of the five Olympic slots available in the men's singles through a repechage play-off at the European Qualification Tournament in Odivelas, Portugal, thereby joining Jančarík on the country's roster for his maiden Games. On the women's side, Hana Matelová secured a singles spot as one of the top-ten table tennis players vying for qualification in the ITTF Olympic Rankings of June 1, 2021.

Athlete	Event	Preliminary	Round 1	Round 2	Round 3	Round of 16	Quarterfinals	Semifinals	Final / BM	
Athlete	Event	Opposition Result	Opposition Result	Opposition Result	Opposition Result	Opposition Result	Opposition Result	Opposition Result	Opposition Result	Rank
Lubomír Jančařík	Men's singles	Bye	Al-Khadrawi (KSA); W 4–0	Gerassimenko (KAZ); L 3–4	Did not advance					
Pavel Širuček	Men's singles	Bye	Powell (AUS); L WO	Did not advance						
Hana Matelová	Women's singles	Bye		Paranang (THA); L 2–4	Did not advance					

== Tennis ==
Men

Athlete	Event	Round of 64	Round of 32	Round of 16	Quarterfinals	Semifinals	Final / BM	
Athlete	Event	Opposition Score	Opposition Score	Opposition Score	Opposition Score	Opposition Score	Opposition Score	Rank
Tomáš Macháč	Singles	Sousa (POR); W 6–7^{(5–7)}, 6–4, 6–4	Schwartzman (ARG); L 4–6, 5–7	Did not advance				

Women

Athlete	Event	Round of 64	Round of 32	Round of 16	Quarterfinals	Semifinals	Final / BM	
Athlete	Event	Opposition Score	Opposition Score	Opposition Score	Opposition Score	Opposition Score	Opposition Score	Rank
Barbora Krejčíková	Singles	Diyas (KAZ); W 5–2, ret	Fernandez (CAN); W 6–2, 6–4	Bencic (SUI); L 6–1, 2–6, 3–6	Did not advance			
Petra Kvitová	Singles	Paolini (ITA); W 6–4, 6–3	Van Uytvanck (BEL); L 7–5, 3–6, 0–6	Did not advance				
Karolína Plíšková	Singles	Cornet (FRA); W 6–1, 6–3	Suárez (ESP); W 6–3, 6–7^{(0–7)}, 6–1	Giorgi (ITA); L 4–6, 2–6	Did not advance			
Markéta Vondroušová	Singles	Bertens (NED); W 6–4, 3–6, 6–4	Buzǎrnescu (ROU); W 6–1, 6–2	Osaka (JPN); W 6–1, 6–4	Badosa (ESP); W 6–3, ret	Svitolina (UKR); W 6–3, 6–1	Bencic (SUI); L 5–7, 6–2, 3–6	2nd place, silver medalist(s)
Barbora Krejčíková; Kateřina Siniaková	Doubles	—N/a	Hsieh Y-c / Hsu C-y (TPE); W 6–2, 6–1	Badosa / Sorribes (ESP); W 6–2, 5–7, [10–5]	Barty / Sanders (AUS); W 3–6, 6–4, [10–7]	Kudermetova / Vesnina (ROC); W 6–3, 3–6, [10–6]	Bencic / Golubic (SUI); W 7–5, 6–1	1st place, gold medalist(s)
Karolína Plíšková; Markéta Vondroušová	Doubles	—N/a	Duan Yy / Zheng Ss (CHN); W 6–2, 6–1	Pigossi / Stefani (BRA); L 6–2, 4–6, [11–13]	Did not advance			

== Triathlon ==
The Czech Republic has entered two triathletes to compete at the Games.

Athlete	Event	Time						Rank
Athlete	Event	Swim (1.5 km)	Trans 1	Bike (40 km)	Trans 2	Run (10 km)	Total	Rank
Vendula Frintová	Women's	20:16	0:44	Lapped				
Petra Kuříková	Women's	19:55	0:42	1:06:26	0:35	36:32	2:04:10	30

== Volleyball ==
=== Beach ===
Czech Republic men's and women's beach volleyball teams qualified directly for the Olympics by virtue of their nation's top 15 placement in the FIVB Olympic Rankings of 13 June 2021.

Athlete	Event	Preliminary round				Repechage	Round of 16	Quarterfinals	Semifinals	Final / BM	
Athlete	Event	Opposition Score	Opposition Score	Opposition Score	Rank	Opposition Score	Opposition Score	Opposition Score	Opposition Score	Opposition Score	Rank
Ondřej Perušič; David Schweiner	Men's	Pļaviņš / Točs (LAT); L (0–21, 0–21)^{[I]}	Gaxiola / Rubio (MEX); W (17–21, 21–16, 16–14)	Krasilnikov / Stoyanovskiy (ROC); L (21–19, 13–21, 8–15)	4	Did not advance					
Barbora Hermannová; Markéta Sluková	Women's	Ishii / Murakami (JPN); L (0–21, 0–21)^{[I]}	Betschart / Hüberli (SUI); L (0–21, 0–21)^{[I]}	Kozuch / Ludwig (GER); L (0–21, 0–21)^{[I]}	4^{[I]}	Did not advance					

Note Because of COVID-19 regulations, Barbora Hermannová and Markéta Sluková were unable to play three matches in the women's beach volleyball tournament, with Ondřej Perušič and David Schweiner missing a single match on the men's side. According to the beach volleyball rules, both Czech teams were awarded a direct defeat and single point, while their opponents received two points and a walkover win.

== Weightlifting ==
Czech Republic weightlifters qualified for one quota places at the games, based on the Tokyo 2020 Rankings Qualification List of 11 June 2021.

Athlete	Event	Snatch		Clean & Jerk		Total	Rank
Athlete	Event	Result	Rank	Result	Rank	Total	Rank
Jiří Orság	Men's +109 kg	180	7	~~235~~	DNF	180	DNF

== Wrestling ==
Czech Republic qualified one wrestler for the men's Greco-Roman 97 kg into the Olympic competition, by progressing to the top two finals at the 2021 World Qualification Tournament in Sofia, Bulgaria.

Key:

- VT (ranking points: 5–0 or 0–5) – Victory by fall.
- VB (ranking points: 5–0 or 0–5) – Victory by injury (VF for forfeit, VA for withdrawal or disqualification)
- PP (ranking points: 3–1 or 1–3) – Decision by points – the loser with technical points.
- PO (ranking points: 3–0 or 0–3) – Decision by points – the loser without technical points.
- ST (ranking points: 4–0 or 0–4) – Great superiority – the loser without technical points and a margin of victory of at least 8 (Greco-Roman) or 10 (freestyle) points.
- SP (ranking points: 4–1 or 1–4) – Technical superiority – the loser with technical points and a margin of victory of at least 8 (Greco-Roman) or 10 (freestyle) points.

Greco-Roman

Athlete	Event	Round of 16	Quarterfinal	Semifinal	Repechage	Final / BM	
Athlete	Event	Opposition Result	Opposition Result	Opposition Result	Opposition Result	Opposition Result	Rank
Artur Omarov	Men's −97 kg	Szőke (HUN); L 1–3 ^{PP}	Did not advance				11
