= Argentina at the 2020 Summer Olympics =

- IOC code: ARG
- NOC: Argentine Olympic Committee
- Website: www.coarg.org.ar (in Spanish)

in Tokyo, Japan July 23, 2021 – August 8, 2021
- Competitors: 189 (131 men and 58 women) in 26 sports
- Flag bearers (opening): Santiago Lange; Cecilia Carranza
- Flag bearer (closing): Pedro Ibarra
- Medals Ranked 72nd: Gold 0 Silver 1 Bronze 2 Total 3

Summer Olympics appearances (overview)
- 1900; 1904; 1908; 1912; 1920; 1924; 1928; 1932; 1936; 1948; 1952; 1956; 1960; 1964; 1968; 1972; 1976; 1980; 1984; 1988; 1992; 1996; 2000; 2004; 2008; 2012; 2016; 2020; 2024; 2028

Argentina competed at the 2020 Summer Olympics in Tokyo, Japan. Originally scheduled to take place from 24 July to 9 August 2020, the Games were postponed to 23 July to 8 August 2021 due to the COVID-19 pandemic. Since making its official debut at the 1900 Summer Olympics in Paris, Argentina has participated in every edition of the Summer Olympic Games, with the exceptions of 1904 in St. Louis, 1912 in Stockholm, and the 1980 Games in Moscow, which it boycotted in support of the United States-led boycott. At the Tokyo Games, Argentina failed to win a gold medal for the first time since the 2000 Summer Olympics in Sydney.

== Medalists ==
Medal	Name	Sport	Event	Date
Silver	Argentina women's national field hockey team: Belén Succi; Sofía Toccalino; Agustina Gorzelany; Valentina Raposo; Agostina Alonso; Agustina Albertario; María José Granatto; Delfina Merino; Rocío Sánchez Moccia; Victoria Sauze; Victoria Granatto; Eugenia Trinchinetti; Micaela Retegui; Emilia Forcherio; Sofía Maccari; Noel Barrionuevo; Julieta Jankunas; Valentina Costa Biondi	Field hockey	Women's tournament	August 6
Bronze	Argentina national rugby sevens team: Rodrigo Isgro; Lucio Cinti; Germán Schulz; Ignacio Mendy; Rodrigo Etchart; Santiago Álvarez; Lautaro Bazán; Gastón Revol; Matías Osadczuk; Luciano González; Santiago Mare; Marcos Moneta; Felipe del Mestre	Rugby sevens	Men's tournament	July 28
Bronze	Argentina national volleyball team: Matías Sánchez; Federico Pereyra; Cristian Poglajen; Facundo Conte; Agustín Loser; Santiago Danani; Sebastián Solé; Bruno Lima; Ezequiel Palacios; Luciano De Cecco; Nicolás Méndez; Martín Ramos	Volleyball	Men's tournament	August 7

== Competitors ==
The following lists the total number of competitors participating in the Games. Reserve players in field hockey, football, and handball are not included in these figures.

Sport	Men	Women	Total
Athletics	3	2	5
Basketball	12	0	12
Boxing	4	1	5
Canoeing	3	1	4
Cycling	2	1	3
Equestrian	4	0	4
Fencing	0	1	1
Field hockey	18	18	36
Football	22	0	22
Golf	0	1	1
Gymnastics	0	1	1
Handball	16	0	16
Judo	1	1	2
Modern pentathlon	1	0	1
Rowing	0	2	2
Rugby sevens	13	0	13
Sailing	4	7	11
Shooting	2	2	4
Surfing	1	0	1
Swimming	1	4	5
Table tennis	2	0	2
Taekwondo	1	0	1
Tennis	6	1	7
Triathlon	0	1	1
Volleyball	14	14	28
Wrestling	1	0	1
Total	131	58	189

== Athletics ==
These Argentine athletes met the established entry criteria for the following track and field events, either by achieving qualifying times or through world rankings, with a maximum of three competitors eligible to participate in each event.

Key

- Note–Ranks given for track events are within the athlete's heat only
- Q = Qualified for the next round
- q = Qualified for the next round as a fastest loser or, in field events, by position without achieving the qualifying target
- NR = National record
- N/A = Round not applicable for the event
- Bye = Athlete not required to compete in round

Track & road events

Athlete	Event	Heat		Final	
Athlete	Event	Result	Rank	Result	Rank
Joaquín Arbe	Men's marathon	—N/a		2:21:15	53
Eulalio Muñoz	Men's marathon	—N/a		2:16:35	31
Belén Casetta	Women's 3000 m steeplechase	9:52.89	12	Did not advance	
Marcela Cristina Gómez	Women's marathon	—N/a		2:44:09	61

Field events

Athlete	Event	Qualification		Final	
Athlete	Event	Distance	Position	Distance	Position
Germán Chiaraviglio	Men's pole vault	DNS		Did not advance	

== Basketball ==
=== Men's tournament ===
Argentina men's basketball team qualified for the Olympics by advancing to the quarterfinal stage as one of the two top-ranked squads from the Americas at the 2019 FIBA World Cup in China.

Team roster

A 15-player roster was announced on 4 June 2021. The final squad was revealed on 18 July 2021.

Argentina men's basketball team roster
Players
Coaches

Pos.	No.	Name	Age – Date of birth	Height	Club	Ctr.
PF	4	Luis Scola	41 – 30 April 1980	2.04 m (6 ft 8 in)	Pallacanestro Varese	(Italy)
PG	7	Facundo Campazzo	30 – 23 March 1991	1.79 m (5 ft 10 in)	Denver Nuggets	(United States)
PG	8	Nicolás Laprovíttola	31 – 31 January 1990	1.94 m (6 ft 4 in)	Real Madrid	(Spain)
SF	9	Nicolás Brussino	28 – 2 March 1993	2.00 m (6 ft 7 in)	Basket Zaragoza	(Spain)
SG	10	Leandro Bolmaro	20 – 11 September 2000	1.98 m (6 ft 6 in)	FC Barcelona	(Spain)
C	11	Francisco Cáffaro	21 – 19 May 2000	2.07 m (6 ft 9 in)	Virginia Cavaliers	(United States)
C	12	Marcos Delía	29 – 8 April 1992	2.06 m (6 ft 9 in)	Pallacanestro Trieste	(Italy)
SF	14	Gabriel Deck	26 – 8 February 1995	1.98 m (6 ft 6 in)	Oklahoma City Thunder	(United States)
PG	17	Luca Vildoza	25 – 11 August 1995	1.91 m (6 ft 3 in)	New York Knicks	(United States)
SF	22	Juan Pablo Vaulet	25 – 22 March 1996	1.98 m (6 ft 6 in)	Manresa	(Spain)
SF	29	Patricio Garino	28 – 17 May 1993	1.96 m (6 ft 5 in)	BC Žalgiris	(Lithuania)
C	83	Tayavek Gallizzi	28 – 8 February 1993	2.05 m (6 ft 9 in)	Regatas Corrientes	(Argentina)

Head coach

- (Argentina) Sergio Hernández

Assistant coach(es)

- (Argentina) Gabriel Piccato
- (Argentina) Silvio Santander

Legend

- (C) Team captain
- Club – describes current club
- Age – describes age
  on 25 July 2021

Group play

Pos	Team	Pld	W	L	PF	PA	PD	Pts	Qualification
1	Slovenia	3	3	0	329	268	+61	6	Quarterfinals
2	Spain	3	2	1	256	243	+13	5	Quarterfinals
3	Argentina	3	1	2	268	276	−8	4	Quarterfinals
4	Japan (H)	3	0	3	235	301	−66	3	

Source: TOCOG and FIBA
Rules for classification: 1) classification points; 2) head-to-head results; 3) head-to-head game points difference; 4) head-to-head number of game points scored.
(H) Hosts

26 July 2021
13:40
v

Boxscore

Argentina	100–118	Slovenia
Scoring by quarter: 24–32, 18–30, 24–26, 34–30
Pts: Scola 23; Rebs: Deck 8 Asts: Vildoza 5		Pts: Dončić 48; Rebs: Tobey 14; Asts: Dončić 5

Saitama Super Arena, Saitama
Referees: Steven Anderson (USA), Yohan Rosso (FRA), Yu Jung (TPE)

29 July 2021
21:00
v

Boxscore

Spain	81–71	Argentina
Scoring by quarter: 20–25, 20–9, 21–19, 20–18
Pts: Rubio 26; Rebs: P. Gasol 8 Asts: M. Gasol 5		Pts: Laprovittola 27; Rebs: Deck 8 Asts: Laprovittola 4

Saitama Super Arena, Saitama
Referees: Yohan Rosso (FRA), Maj Forsberg (DEN), Guilherme Locatelli (BRA)

1 August 2021
13:40
v

Boxscore

Argentina	97–77	Japan
Scoring by quarter: 26–16, 20–22, 19–15, 32–24
Pts: Scola 23; Rebs: Scola 10; Asts: Campazzo 11		Pts: Baba 18; Rebs: Hachimura 11; Asts: three players 3

Saitama Super Arena, Saitama
Referees: Roberto Vázquez (PUR), Mārtiņš Kozlovskis (LAT), Michael Weiland (CAN)

Quarterfinal

3 August 2021
21:00
v

Boxscore

Australia	97–59	Argentina
Scoring by quarter: 18–22, 21–11, 21–15, 37–11
Pts: Mills 18; Rebs: Kay 10; Asts: Ingles 7		Pts: Laprovíttola 16; Rebs: Deck 10; Asts: Campazzo 5

Saitama Super Arena, Saitama
Referees: Antonio Conde (ESP), Aleksandar Glišić (SRB), Mārtiņš Kozlovskis (LAT)

== Boxing ==
Argentina qualified three male boxers for the Olympic tournament, each representing a different weight class. Due to the cancellation of the 2021 Pan American Qualification Tournament in Buenos Aires, Ramón Quiroga (men's flyweight), Mirko Cuello (men's featherweight), and Francisco Verón (men's middleweight) were selected based on their placement among the top five in their respective weight divisions within the IOC Boxing Task Force Rankings for the Americas, thereby securing spots on the Argentine Olympic squad.

Athlete	Event	Round of 32	Round of 16	Quarterfinals	Semifinals	Final	
Athlete	Event	Opposition Result	Opposition Result	Opposition Result	Opposition Result	Opposition Result	Rank
Ramón Quiroga	Men's flyweight	Escobar (ESP); L 0–5	Did not advance				
Mirko Cuello	Men's featherweight	Shadalov (GER); W 3–2	Butdee (THA); L 1–4	Did not advance			
Brian Arregui	Men's welterweight	Johnson (USA); L 2–3	Did not advance				
Francisco Verón	Men's middleweight	Chartoi (SWE); W 5–0	Cedeño (DOM); L 2–3	Did not advance			
Dayana Sánchez	Women's lightweight	Bye	Yıldız (TUR); L 0–5	Did not advance			

== Canoeing ==
=== Slalom ===
With the cancellation of the 2021 Pan American Championships, Argentina accepted an invitation from the International Canoe Federation to send a canoeist in the men's slalom K-1 to the Games, as the highest-ranked eligible nation from the Americas in the federation's international rankings.

Athlete	Event	Preliminary						Semifinal		Final	
Athlete	Event	Run 1	Rank	Run 2	Rank	Best	Rank	Time	Rank	Time	Rank
Lucas Rossi	Men's K-1	103.02	19	98.29	16	98.29	21	Did not advance			

=== Sprint ===
Argentina qualified a single boat in the men's K-1 1000 m for the Games by finishing ninth overall and seventh among those nations eligible for Olympic qualification at the 2019 ICF Canoe Sprint World Championships in Szeged, Hungary. With the cancellation of the 2021 Pan American Championships, two more boats (men's & women's K-1 200 m) were awarded to the Argentine roster based on the results at the 2019 Worlds.

Athlete	Event	Heats		Quarterfinals		Semifinals		Final	
Athlete	Event	Time	Rank	Time	Rank	Time	Rank	Time	Rank
Rubén Rézola	Men's K-1 200 m	35.059	2 Q	—N/a		36.552	7 FB	36.775	15
Agustín Vernice	Men's K-1 1000 m	3:40.430	2 Q	—N/a		3:24.734	4 Q	3:28.503	8
Brenda Rojas	Women's K-1 200 m	43.802	6	44.876	6	Did not advance			
Brenda Rojas	Women's K-1 500 m	1:54.541	4	1:51.822	3	1:58.301	7	Did not advance	

Qualification Legend: FA = Qualify to final (medal); FB = Qualify to final B (non-medal)

== Cycling ==
=== Road ===
Argentina entered one rider to compete in the men's Olympic road race, by virtue of his top 50 national finish (for men) in the UCI World Ranking.

Athlete	Event	Time	Rank
Eduardo Sepúlveda	Men's road race	Did not finish	

=== Mountain biking ===
Argentina qualified one mountain biker for the women's Olympic cross-country race, as a result of her nation's sixteenth-place finish in the UCI Olympic Ranking List of 16 May 2021.

Athlete	Event	Time	Rank
Sofía Gómez Villafañe	Women's cross-country	1:25:13	23

=== BMX ===
Argentina received one men's quota spot each for BMX at the Olympics, as a result of the nation's eighth-place finish in the UCI BMX Olympic Qualification List of June 1, 2021.

Athlete	Event	Quarterfinal		Semifinal		Final	
Athlete	Event	Points	Rank	Points	Rank	Result	Rank
Nicolás Torres	Men's race	13	4 Q	13	5	Did not advance	

== Equestrian ==
With Canada's expulsion from the Games over a positive doping test on the female rider, Argentina received an unused berth to send a squad of three equestrian riders into the Olympic team jumping competition by finishing fifth at the 2019 Pan American Games in Lima, Peru.

=== Jumping ===
Athlete	Horse	Event	Qualification		Final		
Athlete	Horse	Event	Penalties	Rank	Penalties	Time	Rank
Martin Dopazo	Quintino	Individual	10	=52	Did not advance		
José Maria Larocca	Finn Lente	Individual	8	=44	Did not advance		
Fabian Sejanes	Emir	Individual	13	=57	Did not advance		
Matias Albarracin; Martin Dopazo; José Maria Larocca; Fabian Sejanes	Cannavaro; Quintino; Finn Lente; Emir	Team	27	10 Q	49	263.07	7

== Fencing ==
Argentina entered one fencer into the Olympic competition. Two-time Olympian María Belén Pérez Maurice claimed a spot in the women's sabre by winning the final match at the Pan American Zonal Qualifier in San José, Costa Rica.

Athlete	Event	Round of 64	Round of 32	Round of 16	Quarterfinal	Semifinal	Final / BM	
Athlete	Event	Opposition Score	Opposition Score	Opposition Score	Opposition Score	Opposition Score	Opposition Score	Rank
María Belén Pérez Maurice	Women's sabre	Márton (HUN); L 12–15	Did not advance					

== Field hockey ==
Summary

Key:

- FT – After full-time.
- P – Match decided by penalty-shootout.

Team	Event	Group Stage						Quarterfinal	Semifinal	Final / BM	
Team	Event	Opposition Score	Opposition Score	Opposition Score	Opposition Score	Opposition Score	Rank	Opposition Score	Opposition Score	Opposition Score	Rank
Argentina men's	Men's tournament	Spain; D 1–1	Japan; W 2–1	Australia; L 2–5	India; L 1–3	New Zealand; W 4–1	3	Germany; L 1–3	did not advance		7
Argentina women's	Women's tournament	New Zealand; L 0–3	Spain; W 3–0	China; W 3–2	Japan; W 2–1	Australia; L 0–2	3	Germany; W 3–0	India; W 2–1	Netherlands; L 1–3	2nd place, silver medalist(s)

=== Men's tournament ===
Argentina men's field hockey team qualified for the Olympics by winning the gold medal and securing an outright berth at the final match of the 2019 Pan American Games in Lima.

Team roster

The squad was announced on 14 June 2021.

Head coach: Carlos Retegui

No.	Pos.	Player	Date of birth (age)	Caps	Goals	Club
1	GK	Juan Manuel Vivaldi	17 July 1979 (aged 42)	288	0	(Argentina) Banco Provincia
5	DF	Pedro Ibarra (Captain)	11 September 1985 (aged 35)	310	6	(Argentina) San Fernando
6	MF	Santiago Tarazona	31 May 1996 (aged 25)	64	3	(Argentina) GEBA
7	FW	Nicolás Keenan	6 May 1997 (aged 24)	31	6	(Netherlands) Klein Zwitserland
8	MF	Nahuel Salis	6 August 1989 (aged 31)	81	5	(Belgium) Daring
9	MF	Maico Casella	5 June 1997 (aged 24)	77	31	(Netherlands) HGC
12	FW	Lucas Vila	23 August 1986 (aged 34)	256	86	(Belgium) Leuven
13	DF	Leandro Tolini	14 March 1990 (aged 31)	76	48	(Belgium) Gantoise
15	MF	Diego Paz	10 August 1992 (aged 28)	37	1	(Argentina) Ciudad
16	MF	Ignacio Ortiz	26 July 1987 (aged 33)	174	17	(Argentina) Banco Provincia
17	MF	Juan Martín López	27 May 1985 (aged 36)	316	12	(Argentina) Banco Provincia
22	MF	Matías Rey	1 December 1984 (aged 36)	217	7	(Spain) Real Club de Polo
23	FW	Lucas Martínez	17 November 1993 (aged 27)	78	12	(Belgium) Dragons
24	DF	Nicolás Cicileo	1 October 1993 (aged 27)	58	0	(Belgium) Daring
26	MF	Agustín Mazzilli	20 June 1989 (aged 32)	227	58	(Netherlands) Pinoké
27	DF	Lucas Rossi	2 June 1985 (aged 36)	213	11	(Belgium) Beerschot
29	MF	Thomas Habif	27 May 1996 (aged 25)	10	0	(Argentina) GEBA
30	FW	Agustín Bugallo	23 April 1995 (aged 26)	83	3	(Netherlands) HGC

Group play

Pos	Team	Pld	W	D	L	GF	GA	GD	Pts	Qualification
1	Australia	5	4	1	0	22	9	+13	13	Quarter-finals
2	India	5	4	0	1	15	13	+2	12	Quarter-finals
3	Argentina	5	2	1	2	10	11	−1	7	Quarter-finals
4	Spain	5	1	2	2	9	10	−1	5	Quarter-finals
5	New Zealand	5	1	1	3	11	16	−5	4	
6	Japan (H)	5	0	1	4	10	18	−8	1	

Source: Tokyo 2020 and FIH
Rules for classification: 1) points; 2) matches won; 3) goal difference; 4) goals for; 5) head-to-head result; 6) field goals scored.
(H) Hosts

24 July 2021
12:15
v

Argentina	1–1	Spain
Mazzilli 23'	Report	Quemada 52'

South Pitch
Umpires:
Simon Taylor (NZL)
David Tomlinson (NZL)

25 July 2021
19:00
v

Japan	1–2	Argentina
Ke. Tanaka 60'	Report	Tolini 5'; Keenan 19'

South Pitch
Umpires:
Raghu Prasad (IND)
Peter Wright (RSA)

27 July 2021
09:30
v

Argentina	2–5	Australia
Tolini 4'; Casella 55'	Report	Govers 15', 23'; Wickham 21'; Sharp 25'; Hayward 39'

North Pitch
Umpires:
Martin Madden (GBR)
Coen van Bunge (NED)

29 July 2021
09:30
v

India	3–1	Argentina
Varun 43'; Vivek 58'; Harmanpreet 59'	Report	Casella 48'

North Pitch
Umpires:
Jakub Mejzlík (CZE)
Ben Göntgen (GER)

30 July 2021
19:00
v

Argentina	4–1	New Zealand
Martínez 15+'; Vila 17'; Tolini 44'; Keenan 60'	Report	Russell 14'

South Pitch
Umpires:
Martin Madden (GBR)
Coen van Bunge (NED)

Quarterfinal

1 August 2021
09:30
v

Germany	3–1	Argentina
Windfeder 19', 48'; Herzbruch 40'	Report	Casella 52'

Umpires:
Coen van Bunge (NED)
Jakub Mejzlík (CZE)

=== Women's tournament ===
Argentina women's field hockey team qualified for the Olympics by winning the gold medal and securing an outright berth at the final match of the 2019 Pan American Games in Lima.

Team roster

The squad was announced on 21 June 2021.

Head coach: Carlos Retegui

No.	Pos.	Player	Date of birth (age)	Caps	Goals	Club
1	GK	Belén Succi	16 October 1985 (aged 35)	240		(Argentina) River Plate
2	MF	Sofía Toccalino	20 March 1997 (aged 24)	95	7	(Argentina) St. Catherine's
3	DF	Agustina Gorzelany	11 March 1996 (aged 25)	55	17	(Argentina) San Martín
4	DF	Valentina Raposo	28 January 2003 (aged 18)	2	0	(Argentina) Popeye
5	MF	Agostina Alonso	1 October 1995 (aged 25)	89	5	(Argentina) Banco Nación
7	FW	Agustina Albertario	1 January 1993 (aged 28)	168	49	(Argentina) Lomas
10	FW	María José Granatto	21 April 1995 (aged 26)	134	73	(Argentina) Santa Bárbara
12	FW	Delfina Merino	15 October 1989 (aged 31)	296	96	(Argentina) Banco Provincia
17	MF	Rocío Sánchez Moccia	2 August 1988 (aged 32)	247	17	(Argentina) Liceo Naval
18	MF	Victoria Sauze	21 July 1991 (aged 30)	83	2	(Argentina) River Plate
21	FW	Victoria Granatto	9 April 1991 (aged 30)	26	7	(Argentina) Santa Bárbara
22	MF	Eugenia Trinchinetti	17 July 1997 (aged 24)	103	13	(Argentina) San Fernando
23	MF	Micaela Retegui	23 April 1996 (aged 25)	40	5	(Argentina) San Fernando
24	MF	Emilia Forcherio	16 February 1995 (aged 26)			(Argentina) Lomas
26	MF	Sofía Maccari	3 July 1984 (aged 37)			(Argentina) San Fernando
27	DF	Noel Barrionuevo (captain)	16 May 1984 (aged 37)	337	182	(Argentina) Newman
28	FW	Julieta Jankunas	20 January 1999 (aged 22)	102	45	(Argentina) Ciudad
32	DF	Valentina Costa Biondi	13 September 1995 (aged 25)	38	2	(Argentina) San Fernando

Group play

Pos	Team	Pld	W	D	L	GF	GA	GD	Pts	Qualification
1	Australia	5	5	0	0	13	1	+12	15	Quarterfinals
2	Spain	5	3	0	2	9	8	+1	9	Quarterfinals
3	Argentina	5	3	0	2	8	8	0	9	Quarterfinals
4	New Zealand	5	2	0	3	8	7	+1	6	Quarterfinals
5	China	5	2	0	3	9	16	−7	6	
6	Japan (H)	5	0	0	5	6	13	−7	0	

Source: Tokyo 2020 and FIH
Rules for classification: 1) points; 2) matches won; 3) goal difference; 4) goals for; 5) head-to-head result; 6) field goals scored.
(H) Hosts

25 July 2021
12:15
v

New Zealand	3–0	Argentina
Smith 35'; Ralph 40'; Pearson 54'	Report

South Pitch
Umpires:
Sarah Wilson (GBR)
Maggie Giddens (USA)

26 July 2021
19:00
v

Argentina	3–0	Spain
Raposo 47'; Albertario 57'; Barrionuevo 59'	Report

South Pitch
Umpires:
Ayanna McClean (TTO)
Aleisha Neumann (AUS)

28 July 2021
19:00
v

Argentina	3–2	China
Gorzelany 18', 24'; Jankunas 54'	Report	Li H. 52'; Liu 56'

South Pitch
Umpires:
Annelize Rostron (RSA)
Emi Yamada (JPN)

29 July 2021
20:45
v

Japan	1–2	Argentina
Mori 19'	Report	Gorzelany 10'; M. Granatto 45'

North Pitch
Umpires:
Kelly Hudson (NZL)
Ayanna McClean (TTO)

31 July 2021
11:45
v

Argentina	0–2	Australia
	Report	S. Fitzpatrick 49'; Chalker 59'

North Pitch
Umpires:
Michelle Meister (GER)
Michelle Joubert (RSA)

Quarterfinal

2 August 2021
09:30
v

Germany	0–3	Argentina
	Report	Albertario 27'; V. Granatto 29'; Raposo 52'

Umpires:
Laurine Delforge (BEL)
Amber Church (NZL)

Semifinal

4 August 2021
19:00
v

Argentina	2–1	India
Barrionuevo 18', 37'	Report	Gurjit 2'

Umpires:
Amber Church (NZL)
Sarah Wilson (GBR)

Gold medal game

6 August 2021
19:00
v

(gold) Netherlands	3–1	Argentina (silver)
Van Geffen 23'; Van Maasakker 26', 29'	Report	Gorzelany 30+'

Umpires:
Laurine Delforge (BEL)
Sarah Wilson (GBR)

== Football ==
Summary

Key:

- A.E.T – After extra time.
- P – Match decided by penalty-shootout.

Team	Event	Group Stage				Quarterfinal	Semifinal	Final / BM	
Team	Event	Opposition Score	Opposition Score	Opposition Score	Rank	Opposition Score	Opposition Score	Opposition Score	Rank
Argentina men's	Men's tournament	Australia; L 0–2	Egypt; W 1–0	Spain; D 1–1	3	did not advance			

=== Men's tournament ===
Argentina men's football team qualified for the Olympics by securing an outright berth as the final stage winner at the 2020 CONMEBOL Pre-Olympic Tournament in Colombia.

Team roster

Argentina's final squad was announced on 1 July 2021.

Head coach: Fernando Batista

No.	Pos.	Player	Date of birth (age)	Club
1	GK	Jeremías Ledesma*	13 February 1993 (aged 28)	(Royal Spanish Football Federation) Cádiz
2	DF	Nehuén Pérez (captain)	24 June 2000 (aged 21)	(Royal Spanish Football Federation) Granada
3	DF	Claudio Bravo	13 March 1997 (aged 24)	(United States Soccer Federation) Portland Timbers
4	DF	Hernán de la Fuente	7 January 1997 (aged 24)	(Argentine Football Association) Vélez Sarsfield
5	MF	Fausto Vera	26 March 2000 (aged 21)	(Argentine Football Association) Argentinos Juniors
6	DF	Leonel Mosevich	4 February 1997 (aged 24)	(Portuguese Football Federation) Vizela
7	FW	Agustín Urzi	4 May 2000 (aged 21)	(Argentine Football Association) Banfield
8	MF	Santiago Colombatto	17 January 1997 (aged 24)	(Mexican Football Federation) León
9	FW	Adolfo Gaich	26 February 1999 (aged 22)	(Italian Football Federation) Benevento
10	MF	Alexis Mac Allister	24 December 1998 (aged 22)	(The Football Association) Brighton & Hove Albion
11	FW	Ezequiel Barco	29 March 1999 (aged 22)	(United States Soccer Federation) Atlanta United
12	GK	Lautaro Morales	16 December 1999 (aged 21)	(Argentine Football Association) Lanús
13	DF	Marcelo Herrera	3 November 1998 (aged 22)	(Argentine Football Association) San Lorenzo
14	DF	Facundo Medina (2nd captain)	28 May 1999 (aged 22)	(French Football Federation) Lens
15	FW	Pedro de la Vega	7 February 2001 (aged 20)	(Argentine Football Association) Lanús
16	MF	Martín Payero	11 September 1998 (aged 22)	(Argentine Football Association) Banfield
17	MF	Tomás Belmonte	27 May 1998 (aged 23)	(Argentine Football Association) Lanús
18	FW	Ezequiel Ponce	29 March 1997 (aged 24)	(Russian Football Union) Spartak Moscow
19	DF	Francisco Ortega	19 March 1999 (aged 22)	(Argentine Football Association) Vélez Sarsfield
20	MF	Thiago Almada	26 April 2001 (aged 20)	(Argentine Football Association) Vélez Sarsfield
21	FW	Carlos Valenzuela	22 April 1997 (aged 24)	(Portuguese Football Federation) Famalicão
22	GK	Joaquín Blázquez	28 January 2001 (aged 20)	(Argentine Football Association) Talleres

* Overage player.

Group play

Pos	Team	Pld	W	D	L	GF	GA	GD	Pts	Qualification
1	Spain	3	1	2	0	2	1	+1	5	Advance to knockout stage
2	Egypt	3	1	1	1	2	1	+1	4	Advance to knockout stage
3	Argentina	3	1	1	1	2	3	−1	4	
4	Australia	3	1	0	2	2	3	−1	3	

Source: TOCOG and FIFA
Rules for classification: Group stage tiebreakers
22 July 2021
19:30

Argentina	0–2	Australia
	Report (TOCOG); Report (FIFA)	Wales 14'; Tilio 80'

Sapporo Dome, Sapporo
Referee: Srđan Jovanović (Serbia)

25 July 2021
16:30

Egypt	0–1	Argentina
	Report (TOCOG); Report (FIFA)	Medina 52'

Sapporo Dome, Sapporo
Referee: Georgi Kabakov (Bulgaria)

28 July 2021
20:00

Spain	1–1	Argentina
Merino 66'	Report (TOCOG); Report (FIFA)	Belmonte 87'

Saitama Stadium 2002, Saitama
Referee: Ismail Elfath (United States)

== Golf ==
Argentina entered one golfer into the Olympic tournament. Magdalena Simmermacher (world no. 399) received a spare berth declined by one of the top 60 original official entrants to compete in the women's event, as the next highest-ranked golfer vying for qualification based on the IGF World Rankings. Emiliano Grillo was initially selected to compete in the men's event but chose not to play.

Athlete	Event	Round 1	Round 2	Round 3	Round 4	Total		
Athlete	Event	Score	Score	Score	Score	Score	Par	Rank
Magdalena Simmermacher	Women's	76	70	78	76	300	+16	58

== Gymnastics ==
=== Artistic ===
Argentina entered one artistic gymnast into the Olympic competition. Seventeen-year-old Martina Dominici booked a spot in the women's individual all-around and apparatus events, by finishing seventh out of the twenty gymnasts eligible for qualification at the 2019 World Championships in Stuttgart, Germany. On 23 June 2021, Dominici was reportedly tested positive for a banned substance, while deliberately waiting for the results of her appeal to compete at the Olympics; otherwise, her spot would be allocated to Abigail Magistrati, the nation's next highest-ranked gymnast at the 2019 World Championships.

Women

Athlete	Event	Qualification						Final					
Athlete	Event	Apparatus				Total	Rank	Apparatus				Total	Rank
Athlete	Event	V	UB	BB	F	Total	Rank	V	UB	BB	F	Total	Rank
Abigail Magistrati	All-around	13.366	11.533	11.233	12.133	48.265	69	did not advance					

== Handball ==
Summary

Key:

- ET: After extra time
- P – Match decided by penalty-shootout.

Team	Event	Group Stage						Quarterfinal	Semifinal	Final / BM	
Team	Event	Opposition Score	Opposition Score	Opposition Score	Opposition Score	Opposition Score	Rank	Opposition Score	Opposition Score	Opposition Score	Rank
Argentina men's	Men's tournament	France; L 27–33	Germany; L 25–33	Norway; L 23–27	Brazil; L 23–25	Spain; L 27–36	6	Did not advance			

=== Men's tournament ===
Argentina men's handball team qualified for the Olympics by winning the gold medal and securing an outright berth at the final match of the 2019 Pan American Games in Lima.

Team roster

The squad was announced on 2 July 2021. On 31 July, Federico Pizarro was replaced by Santiago Baronetto.

Head coach: (Spain) Manolo Cadenas

No.	Pos.	Name	Date of birth (age)	Height	App.	Goals	Club
2	LW	Federico Fernández	17 October 1989 (aged 31)	1.91 m	186	686	(Argentina) San Fernando HB
3	RW	Federico Pizarro	7 September 1986 (aged 34)	1.83 m	217	703	(Spain) Ciudad Encantada
4	CB	Sebastián Simonet	12 May 1986 (aged 35)	1.90 m	190	405	(Argentina) SAG Villa Ballester
6	CB	Diego Simonet	26 December 1989 (aged 31)	1.89 m	105	324	(France) Montpellier Handball
7	LW	Ignacio Pizarro	8 February 1990 (aged 31)	1.78 m	58	161	(Argentina) San Fernando HB
8	LB	Pablo Simonet	4 May 1992 (aged 29)	1.85 m	111	236	(Spain) Ciudad Encantada
9	RW	Santiago Baronetto	27 October 1992 (aged 28)	1.87 m	57	156	(Spain) CB Villa De Aranda
11	P	Lucas Moscariello	19 February 1992 (aged 29)	1.90 m	68	146	(France) Montpellier Handball
15	P	Gonzalo Carou	15 August 1979 (aged 41)	1.90 m	265	247	(Spain) Puerto Sagunto
19	CB	Pedro Martinez Cami	20 December 1999 (aged 21)	1.90 m	9	19	(Spain) C.D. Ademar LeÓn
20	RW	Ramiro Martínez	22 July 1995 (aged 26)	1.80 m	36	80	(Spain) Balonmano Sinfín
22	P	Gastón Mouriño	12 October 1994 (aged 26)	1.92 m	43	69	(Russia) Don Cossacks SFEDU
23	RW	Pablo Vainstein	18 July 1989 (aged 32)	1.84 m	104	112	(Spain) BM Benidorm
40	GK	Leonel Maciel	4 January 1989 (aged 32)	1.92 m	88	11	(Spain) FC Barcelona
77	LB	Nicolás Bonanno	18 November 1991 (aged 29)	1.98 m	56	56	(Spain) Anaitasuna
87	GK	Juan Bar	29 June 1987 (aged 34)	1.90 m	39	2	(Spain) Anaitasuna

Group play

Pos	Team	Pld	W	D	L	GF	GA	GD	Pts	Qualification
1	France	5	4	0	1	162	148	+14	8 (Note: France 36–31 Spain)	Quarter-finals
2	Spain	5	4	0	1	155	142	+13	8	Quarter-finals
3	Germany	5	3	0	2	146	131	+15	6 (Note: Germany 28–23 Norway)	Quarter-finals
4	Norway	5	3	0	2	136	132	+4	6	Quarter-finals
5	Brazil	5	1	0	4	128	145	−17	2	
6	Argentina	5	0	0	5	125	154	−29	0	

Source: Tokyo 2020 and IHF
Rules for classification: 1) Points; 2) Head-to-head points; 3) Head-to-head goal difference; 4) Head-to-head goals scored; 5) Goal difference; 6) Goals scored; 7) Draw.
Notes:

24 July 2021; 11:00	France	33–27	Argentina	Yoyogi National Gymnasium, Tokyo; Referees: Belkhiri, Hamidi (ALG)
24 July 2021; 11:00	Richardson 7	(12–10)	D. Simonet 8	Yoyogi National Gymnasium, Tokyo; Referees: Belkhiri, Hamidi (ALG)
24 July 2021; 11:00	1× (yellow card) 5× (suspension)	Report	1× (yellow card) 4× (suspension)	Yoyogi National Gymnasium, Tokyo; Referees: Belkhiri, Hamidi (ALG)

26 July 2021; 11:00	Argentina	25–33	Germany	Yoyogi National Gymnasium, Tokyo; Referees: Horáček, Novotný (CZE)
26 July 2021; 11:00	Martínez, D. Simonet 5	(13–14)	Kastening, Schiller 7	Yoyogi National Gymnasium, Tokyo; Referees: Horáček, Novotný (CZE)
26 July 2021; 11:00	3× (yellow card) 4× (suspension)	Report	2× (yellow card) 3× (suspension) 1× (red card)	Yoyogi National Gymnasium, Tokyo; Referees: Horáček, Novotný (CZE)

28 July 2021; 16:15	Norway	27–23	Argentina	Yoyogi National Gymnasium, Tokyo; Referees: Fonseca, Santos (POR)
28 July 2021; 16:15	Sagosen 7	(13–12)	Pizarro, D. Simonet 5	Yoyogi National Gymnasium, Tokyo; Referees: Fonseca, Santos (POR)
28 July 2021; 16:15	2× (yellow card) 4× (suspension)	Report	2× (yellow card) 7× (suspension)	Yoyogi National Gymnasium, Tokyo; Referees: Fonseca, Santos (POR)

30 July 2021; 09:00	Argentina	23–25	Brazil	Yoyogi National Gymnasium, Tokyo; Referees: Lah, Sok (SLO)
30 July 2021; 09:00	Martínez 6	(7–14)	Silva 7	Yoyogi National Gymnasium, Tokyo; Referees: Lah, Sok (SLO)
30 July 2021; 09:00	2× (yellow card) 4× (suspension) 1× (red card)	Report	1× (yellow card) 5× (suspension) 1× (red card)	Yoyogi National Gymnasium, Tokyo; Referees: Lah, Sok (SLO)

1 August 2021; 14:15	Spain	36–27	Argentina	Yoyogi National Gymnasium, Tokyo; Referees: Kurtagic, Wetterwik (SWE)
1 August 2021; 14:15	Gómez 6	(17–12)	Pizarro 5	Yoyogi National Gymnasium, Tokyo; Referees: Kurtagic, Wetterwik (SWE)
1 August 2021; 14:15	3× (suspension)	Report	3× (suspension)	Yoyogi National Gymnasium, Tokyo; Referees: Kurtagic, Wetterwik (SWE)

== Judo ==
Argentina qualified two judoka (one per gender) for each of the following weight classes at the Games. Remarkably going to her fourth consecutive Games, Paula Pareto was officially selected among the top 18 judoka to defend her title in the women's extra-lightweight category (48 kg) based on the IJF World Ranking List of June 28, 2021, while her fellow Olympian Emmanuel Lucenti (men's half-middleweight, 81 kg) accepted a continental berth from the Americas as the nation's top-ranked judoka outside of direct qualifying position.

Athlete	Event	Round of 32	Round of 16	Quarterfinals	Semifinals	Repechage	Final / BM	
Athlete	Event	Opposition Result	Opposition Result	Opposition Result	Opposition Result	Opposition Result	Opposition Result	Rank
Emmanuel Lucenti	Men's −81 kg	Bye	Ivanov (BUL); L 00–10	Did not advance				
Paula Pareto	Women's −48 kg	Whitebooi (RSA); W 10–00	Štangar (SLO); W 10–00	Tonaki (JPN); L 00–10	Bye	Costa (POR); L 00–10	Did not advance	7

== Modern pentathlon ==
Argentine athletes qualified for the following spots to compete in modern pentathlon. Sergio Villamayor secured a selection in men's event by winning the bronze medal and finishing among the top two for Latin America at the 2019 Pan American Games in Lima.

Athlete	Event	Fencing (épée one touch)				Swimming (200 m freestyle)			Riding (show jumping)			Combined: shooting/running (10 m air pistol)/(3200 m)			Total points	Final rank
Athlete	Event	RR	BR	Rank	MP points	Time	Rank	MP points	Penalties	Rank	MP points	Time	Rank	MP Points	Total points	Final rank
Sergio Villamayor	Men's	11–24	0	33	166	2:10.34	35	290	30	27	270	11:42.61	27	598	1324	30

== Rowing ==
Argentina qualified one boat in the women's lightweight double sculls for the Games by winning the gold medal and securing the first of three berths available at the 2021 FISA Americas Olympic Qualification Regatta in Rio de Janeiro, Brazil.

Athlete	Event	Heats		Repechage		Semifinals		Final	
Athlete	Event	Time	Rank	Time	Rank	Time	Rank	Time	Rank
Milka Kraljev; Evelyn Silvestro	Women's lightweight double sculls	7:29.27	6 R	7:39.53	4 FC	Bye		7:05.82	13

Qualification Legend: FA=Final A (medal); FB=Final B (non-medal); FC=Final C (non-medal); FD=Final D (non-medal); FE=Final E (non-medal); FF=Final F (non-medal); SA/B=Semifinals A/B; SC/D=Semifinals C/D; SE/F=Semifinals E/F; QF=Quarterfinals; R=Repechage

== Rugby sevens ==
=== Men's tournament ===
Argentina national rugby sevens team qualified for the Olympics by winning the gold medal and securing a lone outright berth at the 2019 Sudamérica Rugby Sevens Olympic Qualifying Tournament in Santiago, Chile.

Summary

Team	Event	Group Stage				Quarterfinal	Semifinal	Final / BM	
Team	Event	Opposition Score	Opposition Score	Opposition Score	Rank	Opposition Score	Opposition Score	Opposition Score	Rank
Argentina men's	Men's tournament	Australia; W 29–19	New Zealand; L 14–35	South Korea; W 56–0	2 Q	South Africa; W 19–14	Fiji; L 14–26	Great Britain; W 17–12	3rd place, bronze medalist(s)

Team roster

Argentina's 12-man squad plus one alternate was named on 6 July 2021.

Head coach: Santiago Gómez Cora

No.	Pos.	Player	Date of birth (age)	Events	Points
1	FW	Rodrigo Isgro	24 March 1999 (aged 22)	4	25
2	FW	Lucio Cinti	23 February 2000 (aged 21)	6	30
3	FW	Germán Schulz	5 February 1994 (aged 27)	43	330
4	BK	Ignacio Mendy	29 June 2000 (aged 21)	1	20
5	BK	Rodrigo Etchart	24 January 1994 (aged 27)	34	307
6	FW	Santiago Álvarez (c)	17 February 1994 (aged 27)	44	189
7	BK	Lautaro Bazán	24 February 1996 (aged 25)	31	383
8	BK	Gastón Revol	26 November 1986 (aged 34)	81	941
9	FW	Matías Osadczuk	22 April 1997 (aged 24)	24	315
11	BK	Luciano González	10 April 1997 (aged 24)	29	295
10	BK	Santiago Mare	21 October 1996 (aged 24)	27	308
12	BK	Marcos Moneta	2 March 2000 (aged 21)	4	75
13	BK	Felipe del Mestre	25 September 1993 (aged 27)	19	114

Group play

Pos	Team	Pld	W	D	L	PF	PA	PD	Pts	Qualification
1	New Zealand	3	3	0	0	99	31	+68	9	Quarter-finals
2	Argentina	3	2	0	1	99	54	+45	7	Quarter-finals
3	Australia	3	1	0	2	73	48	+25	5	Quarter-finals
4	South Korea	3	0	0	3	10	148	−138	3	

Source: Tokyo 2020 and World Rugby
Rules for classification: 1) Points; 2) Head-to-head result; 3) Point difference; 4) Points scored.

26 July 2021
10:30

Australia	19–29	Argentina
Try: Turner (2) 9' m, 12' c Kerevi 13' c Con: Longbottom (2/3) 12', 13'	(Tokyo 2020)	Try: Cinti 1' m Osadczuk 4' m Moneta 5' c Mendy 7' c Bazán 14' m Con: Mare (2/4) 6', 7'; Bazán (0/1)

Tokyo Stadium, Tokyo
Attendance: 0
Referee: Paulo Duarte (Portugal)

26 July 2021
17:30

New Zealand	35–14	Argentina
Try: McGarvey-Black 4' c Molia 6' c Webber 10' c Mikkelson 12' c Warbrick 14' c Con: McGarvey-Black (2/2) 5', 7'; Webber (1/1) 10'; Knewstubb (2/2) 13', 14'	(Tokyo 2020)	Try: Moneta 2' c González 8' c Con: Mare (2/2) 2', 8'

Tokyo Stadium, Tokyo
Attendance: 0
Referee: Craig Evans (Wales)

27 July 2021
10:00

Argentina	56–0	South Korea
Try: Bazán 1' c Osadczuk 2' c Mare 4' c González 7' c Isgro 8' c Schulz 9' c Revol 12' c Mendy 13' c Con: Mare (5/5) 1', 3', 4', 7', 8'; Revol (2/2) 9', 13' del Mestre (1/1) 12'	(Tokyo 2020)

Tokyo Stadium, Tokyo
Attendance: 0
Referee: Matthew Rodden (Hong Kong)

Quarterfinals

27 July 2021
18:30

South Africa	14–19	Argentina
Try: S. Davids 1' c Penalty try 13'; Con: Geduld (1/1) 1'	(Tokyo 2020)	Try: Moneta (2) 4' c, 7' c Álvarez 12' m Con: Mare (2/2) 5', 7'; Bazán (0/1)

Tokyo Stadium, Tokyo
Attendance: 0
Referee: Damon Murphy (Australia)

Semifinals

28 July 2021
11:30

Argentina	14–26	Fiji
Try: Moneta 6' c Mendy 7' c Con: Mare (2/2) 6', 7'	(Tokyo 2020)	Try: Maqala 2' m Derenalagi 4' c Wainiqolo 8' c Radradra 11' c Con: Bolaca (1/2) 4'; Tuwai (1/1) 9'; Botitu (1/1) 11'

Tokyo Stadium, Tokyo
Attendance: 0
Referee: James Doleman (New Zealand)

Bronze medal match

28 July 2021
17:30

Great Britain	12–17	Argentina (bronze)
Try: Harris 1' m Lindsay-Hague 9' c Con: Bibby (1/2) 10'	(Tokyo 2020)	Try: Bazán 4' m Moneta 5' c Mendy 11' m Con: Mare (1/3) 6'

Tokyo Stadium, Tokyo
Attendance: 0
Referee: James Doleman (New Zealand)

== Sailing ==
Argentine sailors qualified one boat in each of the following classes through the 2018 Sailing World Championships, the class-associated Worlds, the 2019 Pan American Games, and the continental regattas.

Men

Athlete	Event	Race													Net points	Final rank
Athlete	Event	1	2	3	4	5	6	7	8	9	10	11	12	M*	Net points	Final rank
Francisco Saubidet	RS:X	16	14	19	21	~~DNF~~	17	14	UFD	22	20	22	21	EL	212	21
Francisco Guaragna	Laser	13	32	22	12	24	26	~~BFD~~	16	17	11	—N/a		EL	173	24
Facundo Olezza	Finn	5	4	8	5	3	6	~~16~~	15	3	3	—N/a		16	68	6

Women

Athlete	Event	Race													Net points	Final rank
Athlete	Event	1	2	3	4	5	6	7	8	9	10	11	12	M*	Net points	Final rank
María Celia Tejerina	RS:X	20	18	21	18	15	21	18	21	16	~~24~~	17	22	EL	207	20
Lucía Falasca	Laser Radial	37	38	27	21	18	14	20	15	~~40~~	30	—N/a		EL	220	31
Lourdes Hartkopf; María Belén Tavella	470	~~DSQ~~	DSQ	13	19	16	17	16	19	UFD	16	—N/a		EL	160	20
María Sol Branz; Victoria Travascio	49erFX	6	9	13	~~18~~	17	8	6	1	8	1	7	12	2	90	5

Mixed

Athlete	Event	Race													Net points	Final rank
Athlete	Event	1	2	3	4	5	6	7	8	9	10	11	12	M*	Net points	Final rank
Santiago Lange; Cecilia Carranza	Nacra 17	6	2	5	8	4	6	6	~~14~~	10	8	11	9	2	77	7

M = Medal race; EL = Eliminated – did not advance into the medal race

== Shooting ==
Argentine shooters achieved quota places for the following events by virtue of their best finishes at the 2018 ISSF World Championships, the 2019 ISSF World Cup series, the 2019 Pan American Games, and Championships of the Americas, if they obtained a minimum qualifying score (MQS) by 6 June 2021.

Rio 2016 Olympian Federico Gil earned a direct place in the men's skeet for the rescheduled Games as the highest-ranked shooter vying for qualification in the ISSF World Olympic Rankings of 6 June 2021.

Athlete	Event	Qualification		Qualification 2		Final	
Athlete	Event	Points	Rank	Points	Rank	Points	Rank
Alexis Eberhardt	Men's 10 m air rifle	622.6	33	—N/a		Did not advance	
Alexis Eberhardt	Men's 50 m rifle 3 positions	1152	34	—N/a		Did not advance	
Federico Gil	Men's skeet	120	17	—N/a		Did not advance	
Melisa Gil	Women's skeet	115	18	—N/a		Did not advance	
Fernanda Russo	Women's 10 m air rifle	618.9	40	—N/a		Did not advance	
Alexis Eberhardt; Fernanda Russo	Mixed 10 m air rifle team	618.2	27	Did not advance			

== Surfing ==
Argentina sent one surfer to compete in the men's shortboard at the Games. Leandro Usuna secured a spot previously allocated by the defending champion Lucca Mesinas, as the next highest-ranked surfer vying for qualification, following his silver-medal finish at the 2019 Pan American Games in Lima, Peru.

Athlete	Event	Round 1		Round 2		Round 3	Quarterfinal	Semifinal	Final / BM	
Athlete	Event	Points	Rank	Points	Rank	Opposition Result	Opposition Result	Opposition Result	Opposition Result	Rank
Leandro Usuna	Men's shortboard	8.27	4 q	9.67	5	Did not advance				

Qualification Legend: Q= Qualified directly for the third round; q = Qualified for the second round

== Swimming ==
Argentine swimmers further achieved qualifying standards in the following events (up to a maximum of 2 swimmers in each event at the Olympic Qualifying Time (OQT), and potentially 1 at the Olympic Selection Time (OST)):

Athlete	Event	Heat		Semifinal		Final	
Athlete	Event	Time	Rank	Time	Rank	Time	Rank
Santiago Grassi	Men's 50 m freestyle	22.67	38	Did not advance			
Santiago Grassi	Men's 100 m butterfly	52.07	24	Did not advance			
Virginia Bardach	Women's 400 m individual medley	5:01.98	17	—N/a		Did not advance	
Cecilia Biagioli	Women's 10 km open water	—N/a				2:01:31.7	12
Delfina Pignatiello	Women's 800 m freestyle	8:44.85	27	—N/a		Did not advance	
Delfina Pignatiello	Women's 1500 m freestyle	16:33.69	29	—N/a		Did not advance	
Julia Sebastián	Women's 100 m breaststroke	1:09.35	31	Did not advance			
Julia Sebastián	Women's 200 m breaststroke	2:29.55	29	Did not advance			

== Table tennis ==
Argentina entered two athletes into the table tennis competition at the Games for the first time since London 2012. Horacio Cifuentes scored the first-stage final triumph for an automatic spot in the men's singles, with his teammate Gastón Alto joining him to hand one of the last three tickets available in the repechage round at the Latin American Qualification Tournament in Rosario.

Athlete	Event	Preliminary	Round 1	Round 2	Round 3	Round of 16	Quarterfinals	Semifinals	Final / BM	
Athlete	Event	Opposition Result	Opposition Result	Opposition Result	Opposition Result	Opposition Result	Opposition Result	Opposition Result	Opposition Result	Rank
Gastón Alto	Men's singles	Bye	Robles (ESP); L 1–4	Did not advance						
Horacio Cifuentes	Men's singles	Bye	Shing (VAN); W 4–0	Chuang C-y (TPE); L 3–4	Did not advance					

== Taekwondo ==
Argentina entered one athlete into the taekwondo competition at the Games for the first time since London 2012. 2019 Pan American Games champion Lucas Guzmán secured a spot in the men's flyweight category (58 kg) with a top two finish at the 2020 Pan American Qualification Tournament in San José, Costa Rica.

Athlete	Event	Round of 16	Quarterfinals	Semifinals	Repechage	Final / BM	
Athlete	Event	Opposition Result	Opposition Result	Opposition Result	Opposition Result	Opposition Result	Rank
Lucas Guzmán	Men's −58 kg	Woolley (IRL); W 22–19	Hadipour (IRI); W 26–6	Dell'Aquila (ITA); L 10–29	Bye	Artamonov (ROC); L 10–15	5

== Tennis ==
Argentina entered five tennis players (four men and one woman) into the Olympic tournament. Diego Schwartzman (world no. 11), with rookies Facundo Bagnis (world no. 96), Federico Coria (world no. 103), and Francisco Cerúndolo (world no. 117) joining him on the roster after several top 56 original entrants withdrew from the tournament, qualified directly for the men's singles based on the ATP Entry Rankings of 14 June 2021. Nadia Podoroska secured an outright berth in the women's singles by advancing to the final match at the 2019 Pan American Games in Lima.

Having already qualified in singles, both Bagnis and Schwartzman opted to play together in the men's doubles, along with veteran Horacio Zeballos and his partner Andrés Molteni.

Men

Athlete	Event	Round of 64	Round of 32	Round of 16	Quarterfinals	Semifinals	Final / BM	
Athlete	Event	Opposition Result	Opposition Result	Opposition Result	Opposition Result	Opposition Result	Opposition Result	Rank
Facundo Bagnis	Singles	Koepfer (GER); L 6–3, 3–6, 5–7	Did not advance					
Francisco Cerúndolo	Singles	Broady (GBR); L 5–7, 7–6^{(7–4)}, 2–6	Did not advance					
Federico Coria	Singles	Kukushkin (KAZ); L 6–7^{(4–7)}, 5–7	Did not advance					
Diego Schwartzman	Singles	Varillas (PER); W 7–5, 6–4	Macháč (CZE); W 6–4, 7–5	Khachanov (ROC); L 1–6, 6–1, 1–6	Did not advance			
Facundo Bagnis; Diego Schwartzman	Doubles	—N/a	Krawietz / Pütz (GER); L 2–6, 1–6	Did not advance				
Andrés Molteni; Horacio Zeballos	Doubles	—N/a	Murray / Skupski (GBR); L 7–6^{(7–3)}, 4–6, [11–13]	Did not advance				

Women

Athlete	Event	Round of 64	Round of 32	Round of 16	Quarterfinals	Semifinals	Final / BM	
Athlete	Event	Opposition Result	Opposition Result	Opposition Result	Opposition Result	Opposition Result	Opposition Result	Rank
Nadia Podoroska	Singles	Putintseva (KAZ); W 7–6^{(7–4)}, 1–3, ret	Alexandrova (ROC); W 6–1, 6–3	Badosa (ESP); L 2–6, 3–6	Did not advance			

Mixed

Athlete	Event	Round of 16	Quarterfinals	Semifinals	Final / BM	
Athlete	Event	Opposition Score	Opposition Score	Opposition Score	Opposition Score	Rank
Horacio Zeballos; Nadia Podoroska	Doubles	Peers / Barty (AUS); L 1–6, 6–7^{(3–7)}	Did not advance			

== Triathlon ==
Argentina entered one triathlete to compete at the Olympics. Romina Biagioli topped the field of triathletes vying for qualification from the Americas in the women's event based on the individual ITU World Rankings of 15 June 2021.

Athlete	Event	Time						Rank
Athlete	Event	Swim (1.5 km)	Trans 1	Bike (40 km)	Trans 2	Run (10 km)	Total	Rank
Romina Biagioli	Women's	20:09	0:45	1:06:06	0:36	40:06	2:07:42	33

== Volleyball ==
=== Beach ===
Argentina men's and women's beach volleyball teams qualified for the Olympics, by winning the gold medal each at the 2018–2020 CSV Continental Cup Final in Santiago, Chile and in Asunción, Paraguay.

Athlete	Event	Preliminary round				Repechage	Round of 16	Quarterfinals	Semifinals	Final / BM	
Athlete	Event	Opposition Score	Opposition Score	Opposition Score	Rank	Opposition Score	Opposition Score	Opposition Score	Opposition Score	Opposition Score	Rank
Julian Azaad; Nicolás Capogrosso	Men's	Alison / Álvaro (BRA); L (16–21, 17–21)	Brouwer / Meeuwsen (NED); L (14–21, 14–21)	Lucena / Dalhausser (USA); L (19–21, 21–18, 6–15)	4	Did not advance					
Ana Gallay; Fernanda Pereyra	Women's	Ágatha / Duda (BRA); L (19–21, 11–21)	Bansley / Wilkerson (CAN); L (20–22, 12–21)	Wang F / Xia Xy (CHN); L (14–21, 13–21)	4	Did not advance					

=== Indoor ===
Summary

Team	Event	Group Stage						Quarterfinal	Semifinal	Final / BM	
Team	Event	Opposition Score	Opposition Score	Opposition Score	Opposition Score	Opposition Score	Rank	Opposition Score	Opposition Score	Opposition Score	Rank
Argentina men's	Men's tournament	ROC; L 1–3	Brazil; L 2–3	France; W 3–2	Tunisia; W 3–2	United States; W 3–0	3	Italy; W 3–2	France; L 0–3	Brazil; W 3–2	3rd place, bronze medalist(s)
Argentina women's	Women's tournament	United States; L 0–3	ROC; L 0–3	Italy; L 0–3	Turkey; L 0–3	China; L 0–3	6	Did not advance			11

==== Men's tournament ====
Argentina men's volleyball team qualified for the Olympics by securing an outright berth as the highest-ranked nation for pool F at the Intercontinental Olympic Qualification Tournament in Ningbo, China.

Team roster

The Argentina roster was announced on 23 June 2021.

Head coach: (Argentina) Marcelo Méndez

- 1 Matías Sánchez S
- 2 Federico Pereyra OP
- 6 Cristian Poglajen OH
- 7 Facundo Conte OH
- 8 Agustín Loser MB
- 9 Santiago Danani L
- 11 Sebastián Solé MB
- 12 Bruno Lima OP
- 13 Ezequiel Palacios OH
- 15 Luciano De Cecco (c) S
- 17 Nicolás Méndez OH
- 18 Martín Ramos MB

Group play

Pos	Team	Pld	W	L	Pts	SW	SL	SR	SPW	SPL	SPR	Qualification
1	ROC	5	4	1	12	13	5	2.600	427	397	1.076	Quarterfinals
2	Brazil	5	4	1	10	12	8	1.500	476	450	1.058	Quarterfinals
3	Argentina	5	3	2	8	12	10	1.200	476	464	1.026	Quarterfinals
4	France	5	2	3	8	10	10	1.000	449	442	1.016	Quarterfinals
5	United States	5	2	3	6	8	10	0.800	432	412	1.049	
6	Tunisia	5	0	5	1	3	15	0.200	339	434	0.781	

Source: Tokyo 2020 and FIVB
Rules for classification: Tiebreakers

24 July 2021; 14:20 v	ROC	3–1	Argentina	Ariake Arena, Tokyo; Referees: Denny Cespedes (DOM), Paulo Turci (BRA)
24 July 2021; 14:20 v	(21–25, 25–23, 25–17, 25–21); Results Statistics			Ariake Arena, Tokyo; Referees: Denny Cespedes (DOM), Paulo Turci (BRA)

26 July 2021; 22:25 v	Brazil	3–2	Argentina	Ariake Arena, Tokyo; Referees: Shin Muranaka (JPN), Luis Macias (MEX)
26 July 2021; 22:25 v	(19–25, 21–25, 25–16, 25–21, 16–14); Results Statistics			Ariake Arena, Tokyo; Referees: Shin Muranaka (JPN), Luis Macias (MEX)

28 July 2021; 14:20 v	Argentina	3–2	France	Ariake Arena, Tokyo; Referees: Liu Jiang (CHN), Daniele Rapisarda (ITA)
28 July 2021; 14:20 v	(23–25, 25–17, 25–20, 15–25, 15–13); Results Statistics			Ariake Arena, Tokyo; Referees: Liu Jiang (CHN), Daniele Rapisarda (ITA)

30 July 2021; 16:30 v	Argentina	3–2	Tunisia	Ariake Arena, Tokyo; Referees: Juraj Mokrý (SVK), Wojciech Maroszek (POL)
30 July 2021; 16:30 v	(23–25, 23–25, 25–19, 25–18, 15–8); Results Statistics			Ariake Arena, Tokyo; Referees: Juraj Mokrý (SVK), Wojciech Maroszek (POL)

1 August 2021; 23:00 v	United States	0–3	Argentina	Ariake Arena, Tokyo; Referees: Denny Cespedes (DOM), Vladimir Simonović (SRB)
1 August 2021; 23:00 v	(21–25, 23–25, 23–25); Results Statistics			Ariake Arena, Tokyo; Referees: Denny Cespedes (DOM), Vladimir Simonović (SRB)

Quarterfinal

3 August 2021; 17:01 v	Italy	2–3	Argentina	Ariake Arena, Tokyo; Referees: Vladimir Simonović (SRB), Wojciech Maroszek (POL)
3 August 2021; 17:01 v	(25–21, 23–25, 22–25, 25–14, 12–15); Results Statistics			Ariake Arena, Tokyo; Referees: Vladimir Simonović (SRB), Wojciech Maroszek (POL)

Semifinal

5 August 2021; 21:00 v	France	3–0	Argentina	Ariake Arena, Tokyo; Referees: Shin Muranaka (JPN), Liu Jiang (CHN)
5 August 2021; 21:00 v	(25–22, 25–19, 25–22); Results Statistics			Ariake Arena, Tokyo; Referees: Shin Muranaka (JPN), Liu Jiang (CHN)

Bronze medal game

7 August 2021; 13:31 v	(bronze) Argentina	3–2	Brazil	Ariake Arena, Tokyo; Referees: Wojciech Maroszek (POL), Fabrice Collados (FRA)
7 August 2021; 13:31 v	(25–23, 20–25, 20–25, 25–17, 15–13); Results Statistics			Ariake Arena, Tokyo; Referees: Wojciech Maroszek (POL), Fabrice Collados (FRA)

==== Women's tournament ====
Argentina women's volleyball team qualified for the Olympics by winning the pool round with three match points and securing an outright berth at the South American Olympic Qualification Tournament in Bogotá, Colombia.

Team roster

The Argentina roster was announced 26 June 2021.

Head coach: Hernán Ferraro

- 1 Elina Rodríguez OS
- 2 Sabrina Germanier S
- 3 Yamila Nizetich OS
- 4 Daniela Bulaich OS
- 6 Eugenia Nosach OP
- 11 Julieta Lazcano (c) MB
- 12 Tatiana Rizzo L
- 13 Bianca Farriol MB
- 14 Victoria Mayer S
- 15 Antonela Fortuna OS
- 16 Erika Mercado OP
- 17 Candelaria Herrera MB

Group play

Pos	Team	Pld	W	L	Pts	SW	SL	SR	SPW	SPL	SPR	Qualification
1	United States	5	4	1	10	12	7	1.714	418	401	1.042	Quarter-finals
2	Italy	5	3	2	10	11	7	1.571	409	377	1.085	Quarter-finals
3	Turkey	5	3	2	9	12	8	1.500	434	416	1.043	Quarter-finals
4	ROC	5	3	2	9	11	8	1.375	422	378	1.116	Quarter-finals
5	China	5	2	3	7	8	9	0.889	374	385	0.971	
6	Argentina	5	0	5	0	0	15	0.000	275	375	0.733	

Source: Tokyo 2020 and FIVB
Rules for classification: Tiebreakers

25 July 2021; 11:05	United States	3–0	Argentina	Ariake Arena, Tokyo; Referees: Sumie Myoi (JPN), Daniele Rapisarda (ITA)
25 July 2021; 11:05	(25–20, 25–19, 25–20); Results Statistics			Ariake Arena, Tokyo; Referees: Sumie Myoi (JPN), Daniele Rapisarda (ITA)

27 July 2021; 09:00	ROC	3–0	Argentina	Ariake Arena, Tokyo; Referees: Kang Joo-hee (KOR), Hamid Al-Rousi (UAE)
27 July 2021; 09:00	(25–19, 25–15, 25–13); Results Statistics			Ariake Arena, Tokyo; Referees: Kang Joo-hee (KOR), Hamid Al-Rousi (UAE)

29 July 2021; 09:00	Italy	3–0	Argentina	Ariake Arena, Tokyo; Referees: Susana Rodríguez (ESP), Liu Jiang (CHN)
29 July 2021; 09:00	(25–21, 25–16, 25–15); Results Statistics			Ariake Arena, Tokyo; Referees: Susana Rodríguez (ESP), Liu Jiang (CHN)

31 July 2021; 14:20	Argentina	0–3	Turkey	Ariake Arena, Tokyo; Referees: Sumie Myoi (JPN), Hamid Al-Rousi (UAE)
31 July 2021; 14:20	(23–25, 20–25, 18–25); Results Statistics			Ariake Arena, Tokyo; Referees: Sumie Myoi (JPN), Hamid Al-Rousi (UAE)

2 August 2021; 16:25	China	3–0	Argentina	Ariake Arena, Tokyo; Referees: Kang Joo-hee (KOR), Denny Cespedes (DOM)
2 August 2021; 16:25	(25–15, 25–22, 25–19); Results Statistics			Ariake Arena, Tokyo; Referees: Kang Joo-hee (KOR), Denny Cespedes (DOM)

== Wrestling ==
For the first time in 24 years, Argentina entered one wrestler to compete in the men's freestyle 65 kg into the Olympic competition, by progressing to the top two finals at the 2020 Pan American Qualification Tournament in Ottawa, Canada.

Key:

- VT (ranking points: 5–0 or 0–5) – Victory by fall.
- VB (ranking points: 5–0 or 0–5) – Victory by injury (VF for forfeit, VA for withdrawal or disqualification)
- PP (ranking points: 3–1 or 1–3) – Decision by points – the loser with technical points.
- PO (ranking points: 3–0 or 0–3) – Decision by points – the loser without technical points.
- ST (ranking points: 4–0 or 0–4) – Great superiority – the loser without technical points and a margin of victory of at least 8 (Greco-Roman) or 10 (freestyle) points.
- SP (ranking points: 4–1 or 1–4) – Technical superiority – the loser with technical points and a margin of victory of at least 8 (Greco-Roman) or 10 (freestyle) points.

Freestyle

Athlete	Event	Round of 16	Quarterfinal	Semifinal	Repechage	Final / BM	
Athlete	Event	Opposition Result	Opposition Result	Opposition Result	Opposition Result	Opposition Result	Rank
Agustín Destribats	Men's −65 kg	Muszukajev (HUN); L 1–3 ^{PP}	Did not advance				11

== See also ==
- Argentina at the 2019 Pan American Games
