= Oleksandr Prodan =

Ukrainian equestrian

Personal information
- Full name: Oleksandr Serhiyovych Prodan
- Nationality: Ukrainian
- Born: 27 March 1998 (age 26); Dnipro, Ukraine

Sport
- Sport: Equestrian

Oleksandr Serhiyovych Prodan (Ukrainian: Олександр Сергійович Продан; born 27 March 1998) is a Ukrainian equestrian. He competed in the individual jumping event at the 2020 Summer Olympics.
