= Manuel González (equestrian) =

Mexican equestrian

Personal information
- Full name: Manuel González Dufrane
- Nationality: Mexican
- Born: 9 May 1994 (age 30)

Sport
- Sport: Equestrian

Manuel González Dufrane (born 9 May 1994) is a Mexican equestrian. He competed in the individual jumping event at the 2020 Summer Olympics.
