= Mouda Zeyada =

Egyptian equestrian (born 1995)

Personal information
- Born: 13 April 1995 (age 31) Alexandria, Egypt

Sport
- Country: Egypt
- Sport: Equestrian

Achievements and titles
- Olympic finals: 2020 Summer Olympics

Mouda Zeyada (born 13 April 1995) is an Egyptian equestrian. He made his debut appearance at the Olympics representing Egypt at the 2020 Summer Olympics. He competed in the individual jumping.
