= Equestrian at the 2020 Summer Olympics – Individual jumping =

Individual jumping at the Games of the XXXII Olympiad
- Equestrian jumping pictogram
- Venues: Baji Koen
- Dates: 3–4 August 2021
- Competitors: 75 from 35 nations
- Winning total: 0 penalties, 37.85 s in the jump off

Medalists
1st place, gold medalist(s)		Ben Maher	Great Britain
2nd place, silver medalist(s)		Peder Fredricson	Sweden
3rd place, bronze medalist(s)		Maikel van der Vleuten	Netherlands

The individual show jumping event at the 2020 Summer Olympics took place on 3–4 August 2021 at the Baji Koen. Like all other equestrian events, the jumping competition is mixed gender, with both male and female athletes competing in the same division. 75 riders from 35 nations are expected to compete.

== Background ==
This was the 26th appearance of the event, which had first been held at the 1900 Summer Olympics and has been held at every Summer Olympics at which equestrian sports have been featured (that is, excluding 1896, 1904, and 1908). It is the oldest event on the current programme, the only one that was held in 1900.

The Czech Republic, the Dominican Republic, Israel, and Latvia have all qualified riders or teams and are each scheduled to make their debut in the event. France and the United States have both qualified teams and are expected to compete for the 23rd time, tied for most of any nation.

The reigning World Champion is Simone Blum of Germany. The reigning Olympic champion, Nick Skelton did not return to defend his title, having retired shortly after the 2016 Games.

== Qualification ==
A National Olympic Committee (NOC) could enter up to 3 qualified riders in the individual jumping if the NOC qualified for the team event or up to 1 qualified rider if the NOC did not qualify for the team event. A total of 75 quota places were available.

The 20 NOCs that qualified teams and received automatic entries for 3 riders each in the individual competition were:

- The host, Japan
- 6 from the World Equestrian Games: the United States, Sweden, Germany, Switzerland, the Netherlands, and Australia
- 3 from the European Jumping Championships: Belgium, Great Britain, and France
- 1 each from the Groups C1 and C2 qualification events: Israel (C1) and the Czech Republic (C2, replacing Ukraine, which failed to submit its NOC Certificate of Capability)
- 3 from the Pan American Games: Brazil, Mexico, and Argentina
- 2 each from the Groups F and G qualification events: Egypt and Morocco (F) and New Zealand and China (G)
- 1 at-large place at the Jumping Nations Cup Final: Ireland

There were also 15 places available for individual spots. NOCs with qualified teams were not eligible. Each NOC could only earn one individual place. Most of the places were limited by geographic group. The places went to:

- 4 from the Pan American Games for Groups D and E: (Colombia, the Dominican Republic, Canada, and Chile)
- 2 each from the following regional groups by ranking:
  - Group A: Denmark and Norway
  - Group B: Italy and Portugal
  - Group C: Latvia and Ukraine
  - Group F: Syria and Jordan
  - Group G: Chinese Taipei and Hong Kong
- 1 place at-large for the highest-ranked individual from an NOC not yet qualified.

Because qualification was complete by the end of the calendar year 2019 (the ranking period ended on 31 December 2019), qualification was unaffected by the COVID-19 pandemic.

== Competition format ==
For the first time since 1992, the show jumping competition format is seeing significant changes. The five-round format (three-round qualifying, two-round final) has been eliminated, with single rounds for each of the qualifying and final. The number of team members per NOC has been reduced from four to three (with even more significant impact on the team competition). Ties in the advancement spot will now be broken rather than all tied riders advancing. The top 30 riders will advance from the qualifying to the final.

The qualifying round will feature a course with a minimum distance of 500 metres and a maximum of 650 metres. The speed required is 400 metres per minute, though the Technical Delegate may reduce this to 375 metres per minute. There will be between 12 and 14 obstacles, including 1 or 2 double jumps and 1 triple jump, with a maximum of 17 possible jumps (that is, if there are 14 obstacles, only 1 double jump is permitted). The height of obstacles is between 1.40 metres and 1.65 metres, with spread of up to 2 metres (2.20 metres for the triple bar). In general, ties are not broken; however, for the last advancement place, any tie will be broken by time. Only if tied on both faults and time will more than 30 riders advance.

Scores do not carry over from the qualifying to the final. The final will feature a course with a minimum distance of 500 metres and a maximum of 700 metres, with the same speed provisions as the qualifying. The number of obstacles will be from 12 to 15, again with 1 or 2 double jumps and 1 triple jump, with a maximum of 19 possible jumps (15 obstacles with 2 doubles and a triple). The height and spread rules remain the same. Ties are generally broken by time (the round is "against the clock"), but a tie on faults for first place will be broken by a jump-off. A tie for second or third place will only be broken by a jump-off if the faults and time are the same.

The jump-off, if necessary, will feature a six-obstacle course.

== Schedule ==
All times are Japan Standard Time (UTC+9)

Date	Time	Round
Tuesday, 3 August 2021	19:00	Qualifying round
Wednesday, 4 August 2021	19:00	Final round

== Results ==
=== Qualification ===
The best 30 athletes (including all tied for 30th place) after the individual qualifier progress to the individual final.

Rank	Rider	Nation	Horse	Penalties			Time	Notes
Rank	Rider	Nation	Horse	Jump	Time	Total	Time	Notes
1	Ben Maher	Great Britain	Explosion W	0.00	0.00	0.00	81.34	Q
1	Darragh Kenny	Ireland	Cartello	0.00	0.00	0.00	82.01	Q
1	Ashlee Bond	Israel	Donatello 141	0.00	0.00	0.00	82.84	Q
1	Maikel van der Vleuten	Netherlands	Beauville Z	0.00	0.00	0.00	84.61	Q
1	Mario Deslauriers	Canada	Bardolina 2	0.00	0.00	0.00	84.76	Q
1	Bertram Allen	Ireland	Pacino Amiro	0.00	0.00	0.00	85.18	Q
1	Grégory Wathelet	Belgium	Nevados S	0.00	0.00	0.00	85.20	Q
1	Luciana Diniz	Portugal	Vertigo du Desert	0.00	0.00	0.00	85.62	Q
1	Scott Brash	Great Britain	Hello Jefferson	0.00	0.00	0.00	85.72	Q
1	Peder Fredricson	Sweden	All In	0.00	0.00	0.00	85.83	Q
1	Jérôme Guery	Belgium	Quel Homme de Hus	0.00	0.00	0.00	86.10	Q
1	Daniel Deusser	Germany	Killer Queen	0.00	0.00	0.00	86.14	Q
1	Niels Bruynseels	Belgium	Delux van T & L	0.00	0.00	0.00	86.67	Q
1	Yuri Mansur	Brazil	Alfons	0.00	0.00	0.00	86.74	Q
1	Harry Charles	Great Britain	Romeo 88	0.00	0.00	0.00	86.94	Q
1	Malin Baryard-Johnsson	Sweden	Indiana	0.00	0.00	0.00	87.42	Q
1	Nicolas Delmotte	France	Urvoso du Roch	0.00	0.00	0.00	87.49	Q
1	Daisuke Fukushima	Japan	Chanyon	0.00	0.00	0.00	87.51	Q
1	Martin Fuchs	Switzerland	Clooney 51	0.00	0.00	0.00	87.56	Q
1	Kristaps Neretnieks	Latvia	Valour	0.00	0.00	0.00	87.66	Q
1	Henrik von Eckermann	Sweden	King Edward	0.00	0.00	0.00	88.00	Q
1	Marc Houtzager	Netherlands	Dante	0.00	0.00	0.00	88.02	Q
1	Nayel Nassar	Egypt	Igor van de Wittemoere	0.00	0.00	0.00	88.42	Q
1	Koki Saito	Japan	Chilensky	0.00	0.00	0.00	88.56	Q
1	Cian O'Connor	Ireland	Kilkenny	0.00	0.00	0.00	88.66	Q
26	Geir Gulliksen	Norway	Quatro	0.00	1.00	1.00	89.41	Q
26	Eiken Sato	Japan	Saphyr des Lacs	0.00	1.00	1.00	90.40	Q
26	Beat Mändli	Switzerland	Dsarie	0.00	1.00	1.00	91.46	Q
26	Mouda Zeyada	Egypt	Galanthos SHK	0.00	1.00	1.00	91.71	Q
30	Daniel Meech	New Zealand	Cinca 3	0.00	2.00	2.00	93.87	Q
31	Eduardo Álvarez Aznar	Spain	Legend	4.00	0.00	4.00	83.49	
31	Marlon Zanotelli	Brazil	Edgar M	4.00	0.00	4.00	84.11	
31	Steve Guerdat	Switzerland	Venard de Cerisy	4.00	0.00	4.00	85.62	
31	Willem Greve	Netherlands	Zypria S	4.00	0.00	4.00	86.20	
31	André Thieme	Germany	DSP Chakaria	4.00	0.00	4.00	86.45	
31	Jessica Springsteen	United States	Don Juan van de Donkhoeve	4.00	0.00	4.00	87.15	
31	Aleš Opatrný	Czech Republic	Forewer	4.00	0.00	4.00	87.17	
31	Samuel Parot	Chile	Dubai	4.00	0.00	4.00	87.60	
31	Edwina Tops-Alexander	Australia	Identity Vitseroel	4.00	0.00	4.00	87.93	
31	Christian Kukuk	Germany	Mumbai	4.00	0.00	4.00	88.07	
31	Kent Farrington	United States	Gazelle	4.00	0.00	4.00	88.57	
42	Teddy Vlock	Israel	Amsterdam 27	4.00	2.00	6.00	95.74	
43	Mathieu Billot	France	Quel Filou 13	4.00	3.00	7.00	98.99	
44	José Maria Larocca	Argentina	Finn Lente	8.00	0.00	8.00	84.69	
44	Laura Kraut	United States	Baloutinue	8.00	0.00	8.00	85.23	
44	Enrique González	Mexico	Chacna	4.00	4.00	8.00	101.53	
47	Eugenio Garza	Mexico	Armani SL Z	8.00	1.00	9.00	89.10	
47	Emanuele Gaudiano	Italy	Chalou	8.00	1.00	9.00	89.48	
47	Andreas Schou	Denmark	Darc de Lux	8.00	1.00	9.00	89.52	
47	Roberto Terán	Colombia	Dez' Ooktoff	8.00	1.00	9.00	89.71	
47	Jasmine Chen	Chinese Taipei	Benitus di Vallerano	8.00	1.00	9.00	91.01	
52	Martín Dopazo	Argentina	Quintino 9	8.00	2.00	10.00	93.39	
52	Li Zhenqiang	China	Uncas S	8.00	2.00	10.00	95.79	
52	Pénélope Leprevost	France	Vancouver de Lanlore	8.00	2.00	10.00	96.82	
55	Anna Kellnerová	Czech Republic	Catch Me If You Can OLD	12.00	0.00	12.00	86.55	
55	Manuel González	Mexico	Hortensia van de Leeuwerk	12.00	0.00	12.00	88.23	
57	Bruce Goodin	New Zealand	Danny V	12.00	1.00	13.00	90.18	
57	Oleksandr Prodan	Ukraine	Casanova F Z	12.00	1.00	13.00	92.17	
57	Fabian Sejanes	Argentina	Emir	12.00	1.00	13.00	92.49	
60	El Ghali Boukaa	Morocco	Ugolino Du Clos	12.00	2.00	14.00	93.13	
60	Hector Florentino	Dominican Republic	Carnaval	12.00	2.00	14.00	95.53	
62	Abdel Said	Egypt	Bandit Savoie	8.00	7.00	15.00	113.40	
63	Abdelkebir Ouaddar	Morocco	Istanbull V.h Ooievaarshof	16.00	0.00	16.00	87.52	
64	Uma O'Neill	New Zealand	Clockwise of Greenhill Z	16.00	1.00	17.00	91.45	
65	Zhang Xingjia	China	For Passion d'Ive Z	16.00	2.00	18.00	93.60	
	Katie Laurie	Australia	Casebrooke Lomond	Retired				
	Zhang You	China	Caesar	Retired				
	Kamil Papoušek	Czech Republic	Warness	Retired				
	Ibrahim Bisharat	Jordan	Blushing	Retired				
	Alberto Michán	Israel	Cosa Nostra	Eliminated				
	Mathilda Karlsson	Sri Lanka	Chopin VA	Eliminated				
	Ahmad Hamcho	Syria	Deville	Eliminated				
	Ali Al-Ahrach	Morocco	USA de Riverland	Eliminated				

=== Final ===
Rank	Rider	Nation	Horse	Penalties			Time	Notes
Rank	Rider	Nation	Horse	Jump	Time	Total	Time	Notes
=1	Maikel van der Vleuten	Netherlands	Beauville Z	0.00	0.00	0.00	85.31	Q
=1	Henrik von Eckermann	Sweden	King Edward	0.00	0.00	0.00	85.48	Q
=1	Ben Maher	Great Britain	Explosion W	0.00	0.00	0.00	85.67	Q
=1	Peder Fredricson	Sweden	All In	0.00	0.00	0.00	86.77	Q
=1	Malin Baryard-Johnsson	Sweden	Indiana	0.00	0.00	0.00	87.22	Q
=1	Daisuke Fukushima	Japan	Chanyon	0.00	0.00	0.00	87.57	Q
=7	Cian O'Connor	Ireland	Kilkenny	0.00	1.00	1.00	88.45	
=7	Scott Brash	Great Britain	Jefferson	0.00	1.00	1.00	88.45	
9	Grégory Wathelet	Belgium	Nevados S	4.00	0.00	4.00	84.26	
10	Luciana Diniz	Portugal	Vertigo du Desert	4.00	0.00	4.00	84.69	
11	Ashlee Bond	Israel	Donatello 141	4.00	1.00	5.00	88.02	
12	Nicolas Delmotte	France	Urvoso du Roch	4.00	1.00	5.00	88.04	
13	Koki Saito	Japan	Chilensky	4.00	1.00	5.00	89.82	
14	Jérôme Guery	Belgium	Quel Homme de Hus	4.00	3.00	7.00	99.84	
15	Bertram Allen	Ireland	Pacino Amiro	8.00	0.00	8.00	84.64	
16	Martin Fuchs	Switzerland	Clooney 51	8.00	0.00	8.00	84.99	
17	Darragh Kenny	Ireland	Cartello	8.00	0.00	8.00	85.11	
18	Daniel Deusser	Germany	Killer Queen	8.00	0.00	8.00	85.69	
19	Mouda Zeyada	Egypt	Galanthos SHK	8.00	0.00	8.00	86.63	
20	Yuri Mansur	Brazil	Alfons	8.00	0.00	8.00	87.27	
21	Marc Houtzager	Netherlands	Dante	12.00	1.00	13.00	88.10	
22	Mario Deslauriers	Canada	Bardolina 2	12.00	1.00	13.00	88.51	
23	Kristaps Neretnieks	Latvia	Valour	12.00	1.00	13.00	88.75	
24	Nayel Nassar	Egypt	Igor van de Wittemoere	12.00	1.00	13.00	89.63	
25	Eiken Sato	Japan	Saphyr des Lacs	16.00	0.00	16.00	84.67	
	Niels Bruynseels	Belgium	Delux van T & L	Eliminated				
	Daniel Meech	New Zealand	Cinca 3	Eliminated				
	Harry Charles	Great Britain	Romeo 88	Retired				
	Geir Gulliksen	Norway	Quatro	Retired				
	Beat Mändli	Switzerland	Dsarie	Retired				

=== Jump-Off ===
Rank	Rider	Nation	Horse	Penalties	Time (s)
1st place, gold medalist(s)	Ben Maher	Great Britain	Explosion W	0	37.85
2nd place, silver medalist(s)	Peder Fredricson	Sweden	All In	0	38.02
3rd place, bronze medalist(s)	Maikel van der Vleuten	Netherlands	Beauville Z	0	38.90
4	Henrik von Eckermann	Sweden	King Edward	0	39.71
5	Malin Baryard-Johnsson	Sweden	Indiana	0	40.76
6	Daisuke Fukushima	Japan	Chanyon	0	43.76
