= Mathilda Karlsson =

Sri Lankan equestrian

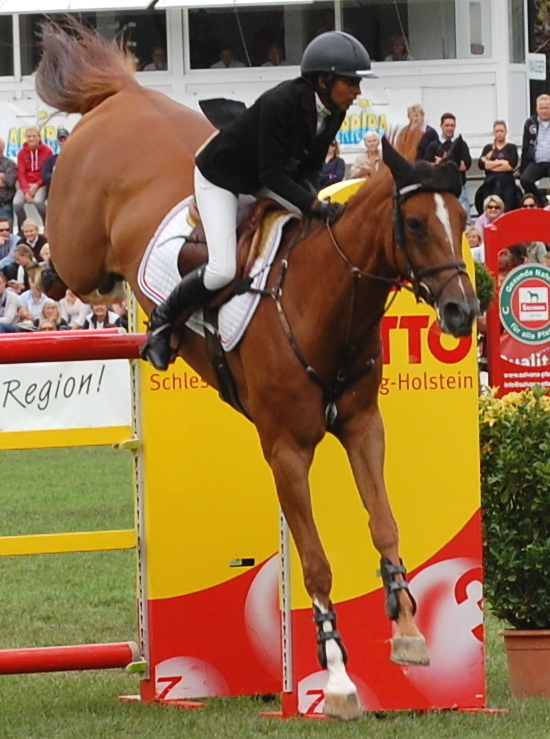
- Karlsson in 2011

Personal information
- Full name: Mathilda Thanuja Karlsson
- Born: 27 September 1984 (age 41) Kandy, Sri Lanka
- Height: 158 cm (5 ft 2 in)
- Weight: 43 kg (95 lb)
- Website: www.groenwohldhof.com

Sport
- Country: Sri Lanka
- Sport: Equestrian
- Club: Hof Gronwohld

Achievements and titles
- Olympic finals: 2020 Summer Olympics

Mathilda Thanuja Karlsson (born 27 September 1984 in Kandy) is a Sri Lankan born Swedish equestrian athlete. Karlsson was adopted by her Swedish parents when she was three months old. She competed for Sweden until 2018, when she switched to her native country. In 2021 she qualified as an individual rider for the 2020 Summer Olympics in Tokyo, being the first Sri Lankan equestrian at the Olympic Games.She also became the first Sri Lankan to qualify for the Tokyo Olympics. Her horse is named as Chopin VA.

In 2023, Karlsson was banned from competition from the FEI for failing to attend drug testing. Her suspension lasts until January 14th, 2025.

== Personal life ==
Mathilda was born in Kandy, Sri Lanka and was adopted by her Swedish parents when she was three months old. Spending her childhood being raised in Sweden, she started riding horses at the age of 7 under the Swedish banner. In 2017 she traveled back to Sri Lanka and realised she was a Sri Lankan and also felt she has to do something for her native country.

She lives in Hamburg, Germany where she runs and manages her own equestrian business Grönwohldhof. She also trains, breeds and sells the horses in Grönwohld Hof. Mathilda is fluent in English, Spanish, Norwegian, Swedish and German.

Her equestrian centre Grönwohld Hof stables which is in Germany was demolished by a fire in May 2020. Two horses died in the incident and the building which she owned was destroyed completely.

== Career ==
She decided to compete for Sri Lanka in 2018 and became the first Sri Lankan show-jumper. By doing so, she is the first Sri Lankan equestrian at the Olympic Games. She also obtained the Swedish-Sri Lankan dual citizenship from the Embassy of Sri Lanka in Germany prior to the Olympics.

She also faced difficulties before qualifying to the Olympics as part of her qualifying points were initially removed in February 2020, following an administrative error from the FEI; however, the decision on points removal was subsequently overturned by the Court of Arbitration for Sport. She was ensured of Olympic berth following the successful appeal against FEI results cancellation. She received a direct qualification for the 2020 Summer Olympics which also marked her debut appearance at the Olympics. She competed in the individual jumping. However, she failed to progress to the next round after being eliminated from the heat event mainly due to her horse which stopped twice.

She has also competed at the Global Champions Tour.
