= Yuri Mansur =

Brazilian equestrian

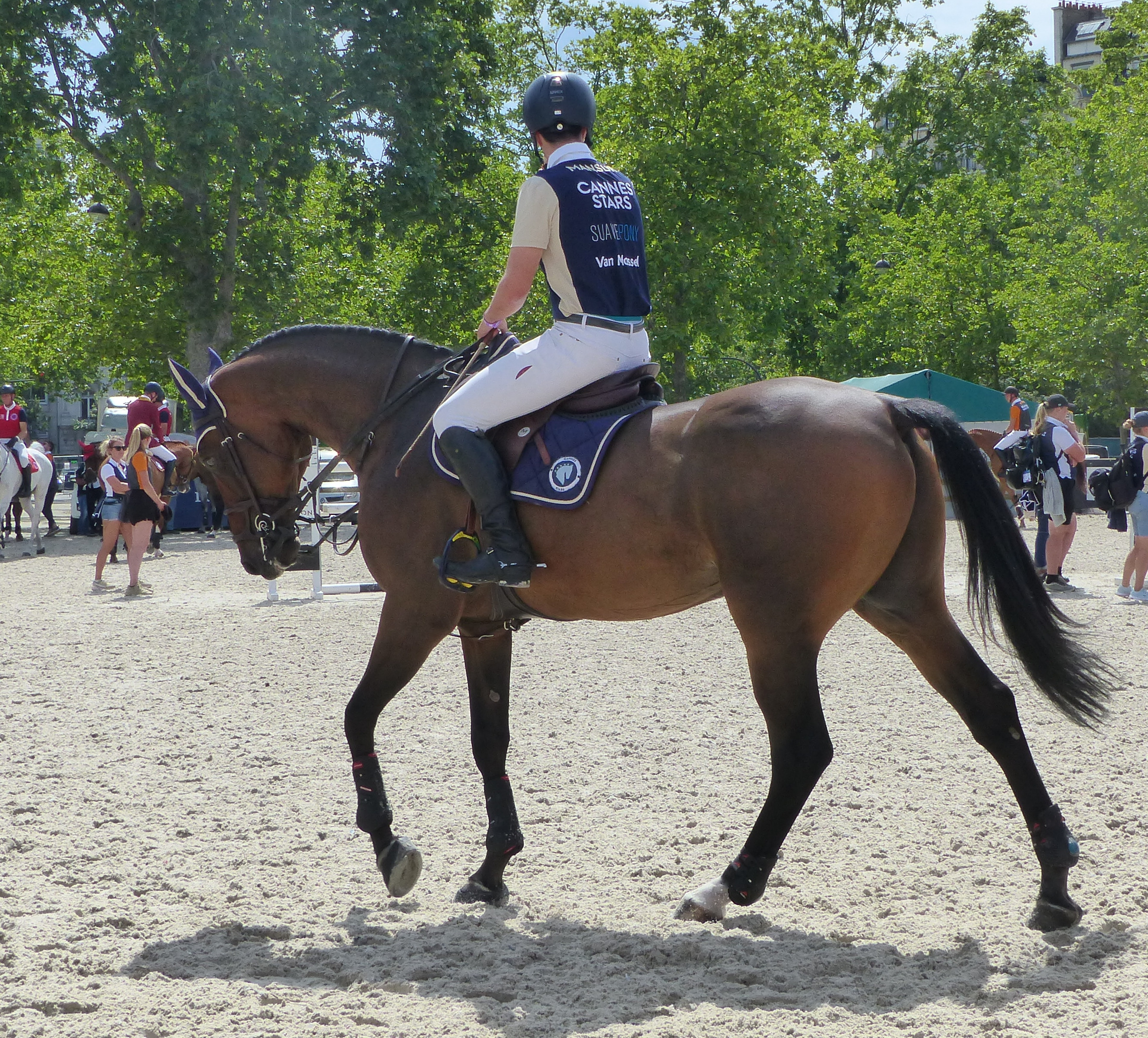
- Mansur in 2023

Personal information
- Full name: Yuri Mansur Guerios
- Discipline: Show jumping
- Born: 24 May 1979 (age 47); São Paulo, Brazil
- Height: 179 cm (5 ft 10 in)

Yuri Mansur Guerios (born 24 May 1979) is a Brazilian show jumping competitor. He represented Brazil at the 2020 Summer Olympics in Tokyo 2021, competing in individual jumping and at the 2024 Summer Olympics in Paris.

He represented Brazil during the World Cup Finals in 2011, 2014, and 2023, being the 4th best result, and in 2026.

Yuri Mansur won several 5*GP being the most important and traditional ones: Hickstead 2017 (with the mare Babylotte), and with the mare Miss Blue, he won: Turkish Airlines Grand Prix in Aachen 2023, Hamburg 2024, Fontainbleu 2025, Rome 2025.

Besides the individual results, Yuri Mansur represented Brazil and stand up on the podium in the most challenging Nations Cup, such as Hickstead, Clagary, La Baule and many others.

In 2025, the athlete won the Playoffs - Global Champions Tour in Prague, with his then 18-year-old horse QH Alfons Santo Antonio, becoming the third athlete in the world with the biggest prize money quotes.

== Career ==
Yuri Mansur started the sport late—he was 14 years old. Despite his late start, Yuri always searched for ways to improve and dribble obstacles that life put in his path.

In 2008, Yuri Mansur developed his brand using the worldwide known yellow jacket, which became his trademark. Now, the yellow jacket represents not only Yuri Mansur but also all his training system and legacy. #followtheyellow movement.

Yuri lived in Brazil until 2014, when he reached the top of the sport in his country. Seeking his dreams, he moved to Belgium with his wife and two children, where he started his new chapter. In 2017 he moved to the Netherlands and built his own stables, where he lives until the present moment.

The athlete is also known as being one of the only riders to compete with older horses (18-year- old - Vitiki, and 19-year-old QH Alfons Santo Antonio) while performing.

=== Miss Blue ===
Yuri and his mare, Miss Blue, achieved several victories in the Grand Prix. The mare was supposed to participate in the 2008 Los Angeles Olympic Games, but a fatal and abrupt colic ended her career much sooner than expected. The beloved Miss Blue left the Yellow Team in June 2025, leaving behind a legacy. She had many foals, with four of them born in May 2026.

=== Vitiki ===
Vitiki is one of the most significant horses in Yuri's career for their connection and the support each one gives to the other.

In 2018, Vitiki and Yuri had a major accident in the most traditional shows, CSIO Aachen, breaking his featlock bone in three pieces. After two years of incredible recovery work, Vitiki was back to the spotlights.

Last World Cup Finals in Omaha 2023, ending 4th placed.

=== Family ===
Yuri is married to Louise Weber and has two children, Pedro Mansur and Marie Louisie Mansur, both of whom are into the horse world. Both children are already creating their on space inside the sport, with many results and developing horses for the sport.
