= Fabian Sejanes =

Argentine equestrian

Personal information
- Born: 4 September 1969 (age 56) Buenos Aires, Argentina

Sport
- Sport: Equestrian

Fabian Sejanes (born 4 September 1969) is an Argentine equestrian. He competed in the individual jumping event at the 2020 Summer Olympics. Fabian Sejanes is suspended until 26 April 2025 for violating the anti-doping policy.
