= Kamil Papoušek =

Czech equestrian

Personal information
- Nationality: Czech
- Born: 29 March 1977 (age 47)

Sport
- Sport: Equestrian

Kamil Papoušek (born 29 March 1977) is a Czech equestrian. He competed in the individual jumping event at the 2020 Summer Olympics.
