= Ondřej Zvára =

Czech equestrian

Personal information
- Nationality: Czech Republic
- Born: 16 November 1983 (age 41); Vlašim, Czechoslovakia

Sport
- Sport: Equestrian

Ondřej Zvára (born 16 November 1983) is a Czech equestrian. He competed in the 2020 Summer Olympics.
