= Aleš Opatrný =

Czech equestrian

Personal information
- Nationality: Czech
- Born: 18 September 1981 (age 43); Hořovice, Czech Republic

Sport
- Sport: Equestrian

Aleš Opatrný (born 18 September 1981) is a Czech equestrian. He competed in the individual jumping event at the 2020 Summer Olympics.
