= Cycling at the 2020 Summer Olympics =

Cycling at the Games of the XXXII Olympiad
- Pictograms from top, left to right: BMX Freestyle, BMX Racing, Road, Mountain and Track cycling.
- Venue: Olympic BMX Course; Izu Mountain Bike Course; Izu Velodrome; Musashinonomori Park; Fuji Speedway
- Dates: 24 July – 8 August 2021
- No. of events: 22
- Competitors: 530 from 73 nations

The cycling competitions of the 2020 Summer Olympics in Tokyo featured 22 events in five disciplines. The 2020 Summer Olympics were postponed to 2021 due to the COVID-19 pandemic.

Cycling competitions had been contested in every Summer Olympics programme since the first modern Olympiad in 1896 alongside athletics, artistic gymnastics, fencing and swimming.

Since the 1896 contests which featured five track events and an 87 km road race from Athens to Marathon and back, Olympic cycling had gradually evolved to include women's competitions, mountain bike and BMX to arrive at the current 22 events.

The cycling program for this edition was expanded with 4 more events than those held in 2016. BMX freestyle was added in the program for the first time and there will also be a return of Madison events on the track that had been removed from the Olympic program in 2012. The award of the extra events was widely seen as a reward for the agreement of the UCI that the track cycling and mountain bike events be taken out of Tokyo and held in Izu, Shizuoka, allowing for significant costs savings to the organising committee. As Izu was not covered by the state of emergency imposed by the Japanese government, cycling was one of the very few sports at these games that allowed a limited number of local spectators to attend.

Great Britain's stranglehold on the velodrome events slackened for the first time since 2008, with their three golds matched by the Netherlands and six other golds shared among six nations. They also failed to win a road medal for the first time since 2004. Nevertheless, with three golds, three silvers and a bronze inside the velodrome, and a hugely successful mountain bike and BMX campaign outside it (three golds, a silver and a bronze from the six events) for the fourth Olympics in a row, Great Britain topped the medal table in cycling with twelve medals, six gold, closely followed by the Netherlands with twelve medals but five golds. Between them the two top nations won half of all the 22 gold medals on offer in cycling; no other nation won more than one, and aside from 12 medals won by each of the 'Big 2', only the Swiss managed more than three medals in total, thanks to their dominance of the mountain bike podium (winning 4 medals from 6).

During the Games, Jason Kenny and Laura Kenny respectively took the records for the most successful male and female Olympic cyclists in history, Jason with a seventh gold in men's keirin, and Laura with a fifth in women's madison. They also became their nation's most successful male and female Olympians in history.

== Venues ==
Track cycling was planned for a temporary venue in Ariake. To save $100 million in construction costs, it was announced after months of negotiations that the venue for track cycling would be the existing velodrome in Izu.

The International Cycling Union (UCI) resisted moving track cycling 120 km outside Tokyo to Izu. The UCI feared it would detract from the Olympic experience for both athletes and fans. Eventually, the UCI agreed to change. The Japanese Cycling Federation and local authorities committed to establishing at Izu a multi-sport cycling center, to create local cycling programs, and to develop the cycling sport.

For road cycling the start and finish were originally planned at the Imperial Palace Garden. Later it was announced that the finishes would be at the Fuji Speedway with the starts of the road races at the Musashinonomori Park.

| Venue | Cluster | Sport | Date | Medal events | Capacity |
|---|---|---|---|---|---|
| Fuji Speedway | Outside Tokyo | Road cycling (finish road races and time trial) | 24 – 28 July | 4 | |
| Izu MTB Course | Outside Tokyo | Mountain biking | 26 – 27 July | 2 | |
| Ariake Urban Sports Park | Tokyo Bay Zone | BMX (freestyle and racing) | 29 July – 1 August | 4 | 5,000 |
| Musashinonomori Park | Heritage Zone | Road cycling (start road races) | 24 – 25 July | 0 | |
| Izu Velodrome | Outside Tokyo | Track cycling | 2 – 8 August | 12 | 4,300 |

== Qualification ==
Japan, as the host country, received one guaranteed quota place per gender in the BMX Racing, BMX Freestyle, and mountain bike events and two quota places per gender in the road race events (there are no guaranteed places in the road time trial or any track events).

Most of the qualification was done through UCI ranking lists, with some spots allocated through world championship events or continental qualification events.

== Participation ==
=== Participating nations ===
- Algeria (2)
- Argentina (3)
- Australia (30)
- Austria (8)
- Azerbaijan (1)
- Belarus (4)
- Belgium (15)
- Brazil (5)
- Burkina Faso (1)
- Canada (23)
- Chile (3)
- China (7)
- Colombia (10)
- Costa Rica (3)
- Croatia (1)
- Cuba (1)
- Cyprus (1)
- Czech Republic (7)
- Denmark (17)
- Ecuador (4)
- Egypt (1)
- Eritrea (3)
- Estonia (3)
- Ethiopia (1)
- Finland (1)
- France (28)
- Germany (28)
- Great Britain (26)
- Greece (3)
- Guatemala (1)
- Hong Kong (5)
- Hungary (3)
- Iran (1)
- Ireland (7)
- Israel (2)
- Italy (24)
- Japan (16)
- Kazakhstan (5)
- Latvia (4)
- Lithuania (4)
- Luxembourg (3)
- Malaysia (2)
- Mexico (7)
- Morocco (1)
- Namibia (4)
- Netherlands (28)
- New Zealand (19)
- Norway (9)
- Panama (1)
- Paraguay (1)
- Peru (1)
- Poland (16)
- Portugal (4)
- Refugee Olympic Team (2)
- ROC (18)
- Romania (2)
- Rwanda (1)
- Slovakia (2)
- Slovenia (6)
- South Africa (11)
- South Korea (2)
- Spain (12)
- Suriname (1)
- Sweden (2)
- Switzerland (20)
- Chinese Taipei (1)
- Thailand (2)
- Trinidad and Tobago (3)
- Turkey (2)
- Ukraine (4)
- United States (27)
- Uzbekistan (2)
- Venezuela (2)

== Courses ==
=== Time trials ===
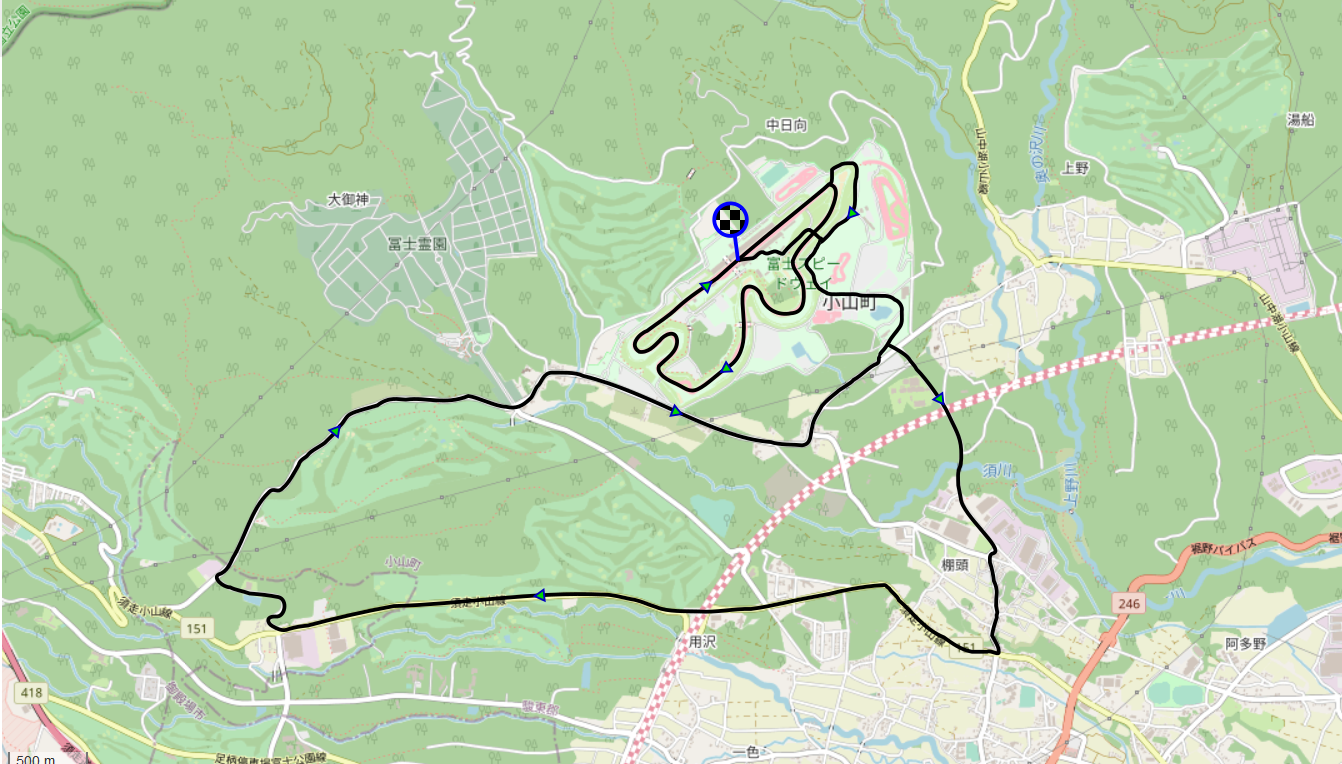
Map of Individual time trial

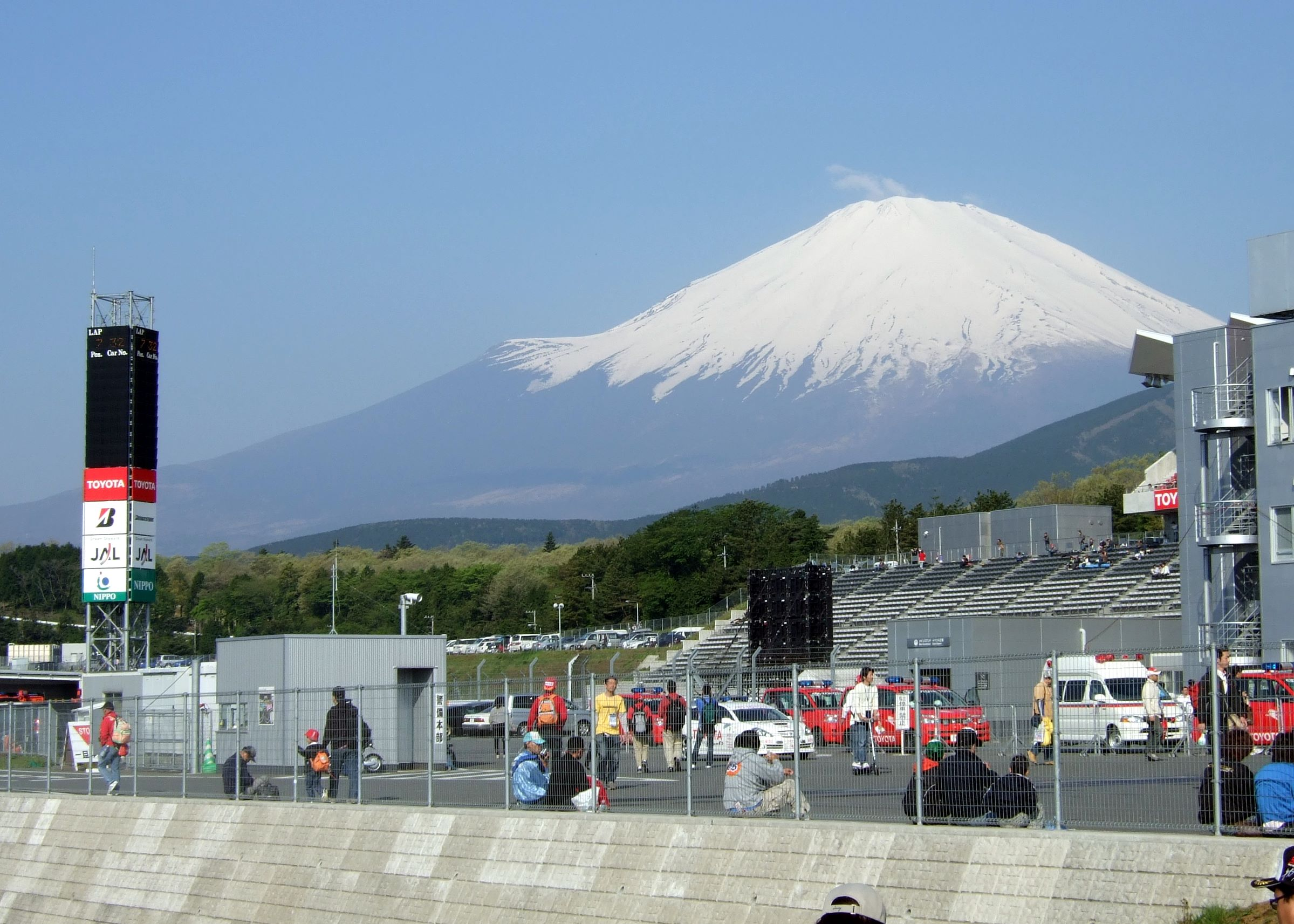
Fuji Speedway

=== Road races ===
The courses for the men's and women's road races were revealed in August 2018. The races started in Musashinonomori Park in Chofu, western Tokyo with the finish at the Fuji Speedway circuit in the Shizuoka prefecture.

The men's road race was 234 kilometres long with a total elevation of 4865 m. The women's race was 137 km long with a total elevation of 2692 metres.

The first part of the men's and women's races is identical. The course first passes through the mostly flat outskirts of Tokyo's metropolitan area. After 80 km there is a long climb on Doushi Road with a total elevation of 1000 m. After reaching Lake Yamanakako in Yamanashi and crossing the Kagosaka Pass there is a fast 15 km descent. From here the courses are different for men and women.

After the descent, the men's race heads towards the lower slopes of Mount Fuji, Japan's highest mountain, with a 14.3 km long climb with a 6.0% average incline. The riders then head to the Fuji Speedway section, where they cross the finish line twice before entering the last part of the race, which includes the Mikuni Pass peak at about 30 km to go. This climb is 6.8 km at a height of 1159 metres with an average incline of 10.2% including sections reaching 20%. After the climb, the race returns to Lake Yamanakako and the Kagosaka Pass before finishing on the Fuji Speedway circuit.

The women's race does not include the two tough climbs at Mount Fuji and Mikuni Pass. Instead, the race remains on the Fuji Speedway circuit, where the women ride 1.5 laps before the final crossing of the finish line.

== Competition schedule ==
| H | Heats | QF | Quarter-Finals | SF | Semi-Finals | F | Finals |

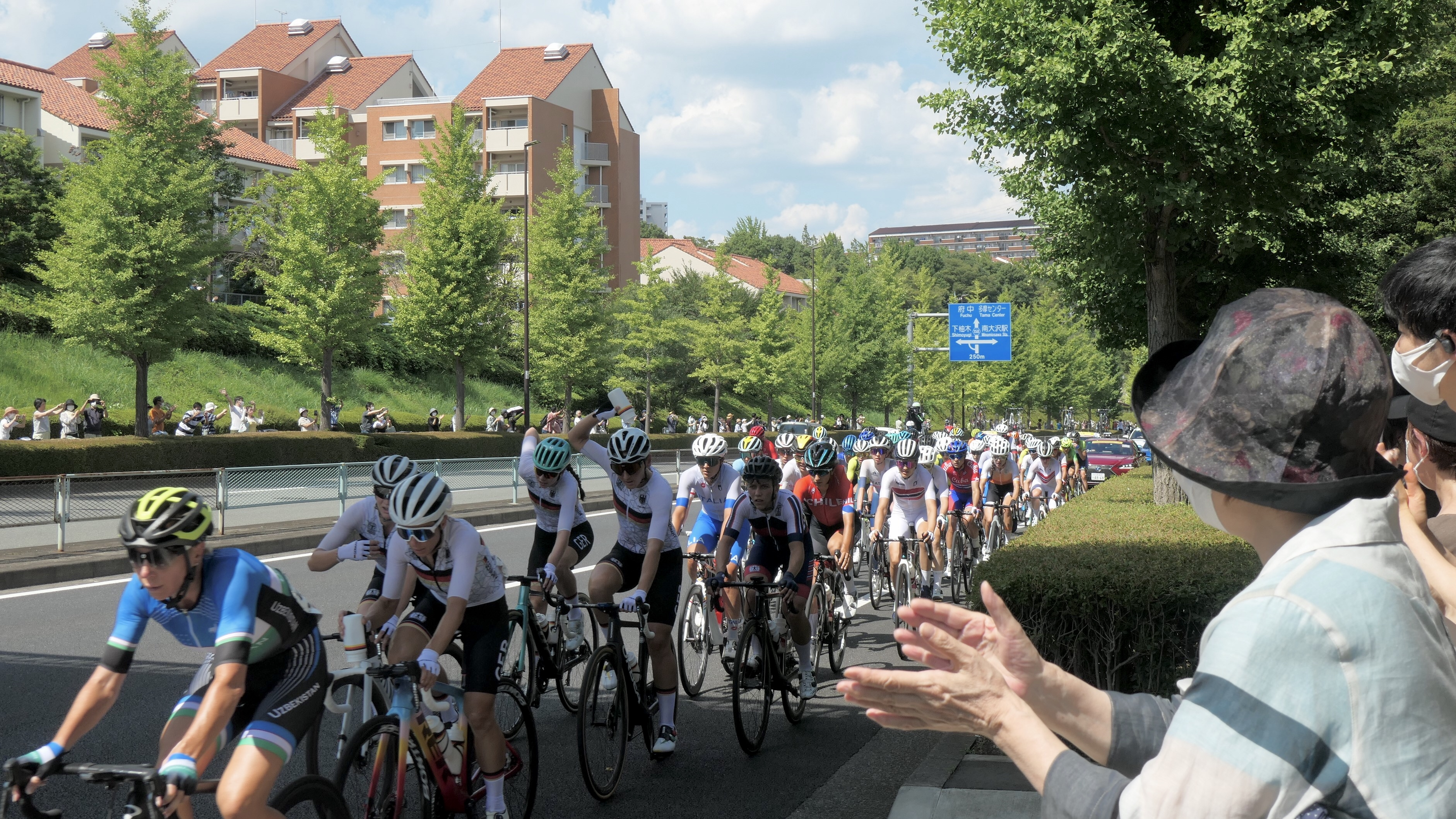
Road cycling

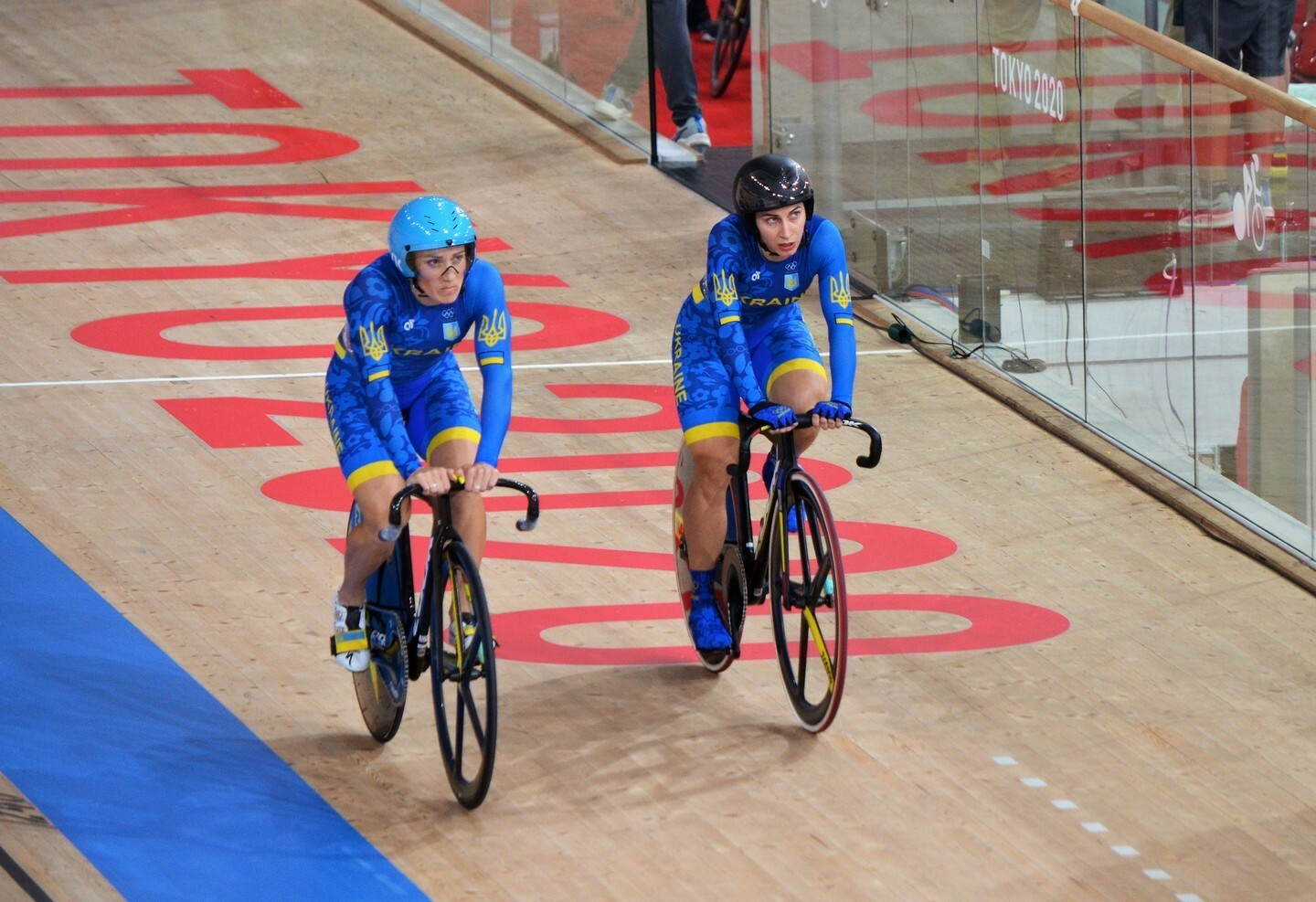
Track cycling

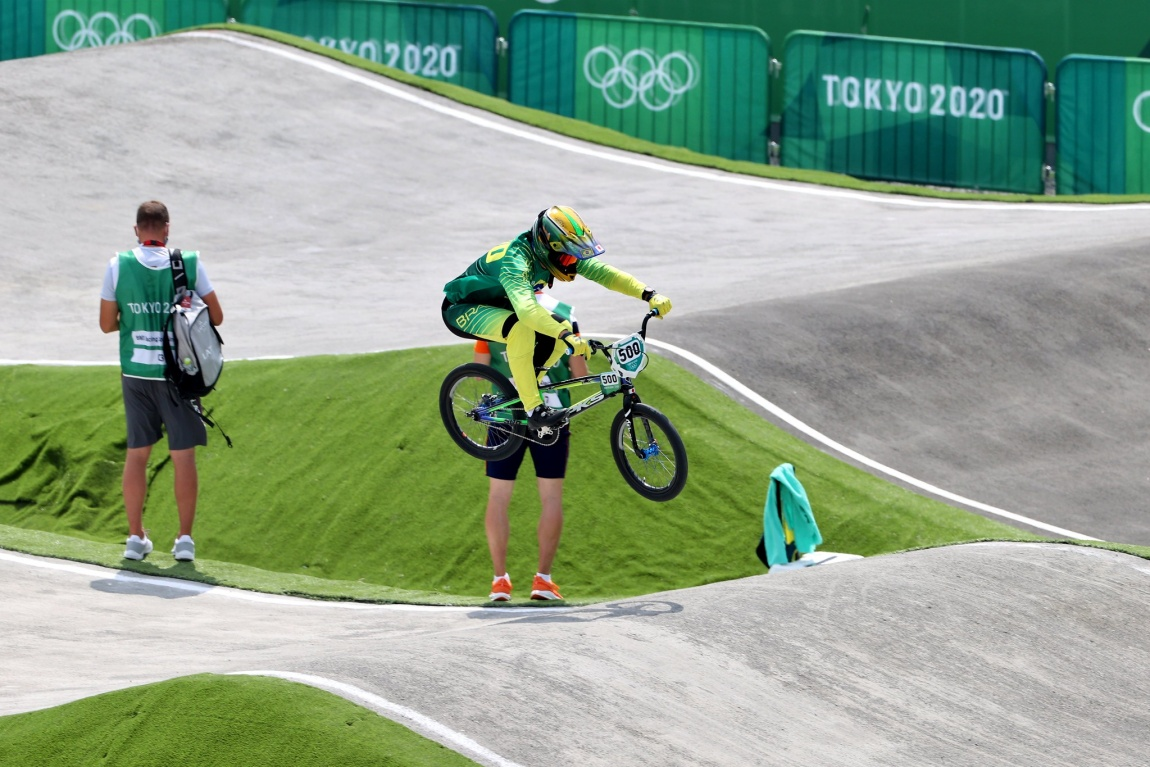
BMX

BMX, mountain biking and road cycling
| Event↓/Date → | 24 July | 25 July | 26 July | 27 July | 28 July | 29 July | 30 July | | 31 Jul | 1 Aug |
|---|---|---|---|---|---|---|---|---|---|---|
BMX Freestyle
| Men's freestyle | | | | | | | | | H | F |
| Women's freestyle | | | | | | | | | H | F |
BMX Racing
| Men's racing | | | | | | QF | SF | F | | |
| Women's racing | | | | | | QF | SF | F | | |
Mountain biking
| Men's cross-country | | | F | | | | | | | |
| Women's cross-country | | | | F | | | | | | |
Road cycling
| Men's road race | F | | | | | | | | | |
| Men's time trial | | | | | F | | | | | |
| Women's road race | | F | | | | | | | | |
| Women's time trial | | | | | F | | | | | |

Track cycling
| Event↓/Date → | 2 Aug | | | 3 Aug | | | 4 Aug | 5 Aug | | | | 6 Aug | | 7 Aug | 8 Aug | | | |
|---|---|---|---|---|---|---|---|---|---|---|---|---|---|---|---|---|---|---|
| Men's keirin | | | | | | | | | | | | | | H | QF | SF | F | |
| Men's Madison | | | | | | | | | | | | | | F | | | | |
| Men's omnium | | | | | | | | SR | TR | ER | PR | | | | | | | |
| Men's team pursuit | H | | | SF | | | F | | | | | | | | | | | |
| Men's sprint | | | | | | | H | | QF | | | SF | F | | | | | |
| Men's team sprint | | | | H | SF | F | | | | | | | | | | | | |
| Women's keirin | | | | | | | H | QF | SF | F | | | | | | | | |
| Women's Madison | | | | | | | | | | | | F | | | | | | |
| Women's omnium | | | | | | | | | | | | | | | SR | TR | ER | PR |
| Women's team pursuit | H | | | SF | F | | | | | | | | | | | | | |
| Women's sprint | | | | | | | | | | | | H | | QF | SF | | F | |
| Women's team sprint | H | SF | F | | | | | | | | | | | | | | | |

== Medalists ==
=== Medal table ===
* Host nation (Japan)

| Rank | NOC | Gold | Silver | Bronze | Total |
|---|---|---|---|---|---|
| 1 | Great Britain | 6 | 4 | 2 | 12 |
| 2 | Netherlands | 5 | 3 | 4 | 12 |
| 3 | Switzerland | 1 | 3 | 2 | 6 |
| 4 | Denmark | 1 | 2 | 0 | 3 |
| 5 | United States | 1 | 1 | 1 | 3 |
| 6 | Germany | 1 | 1 | 0 | 2 |
| 7 | Australia | 1 | 0 | 2 | 3 |
| 7 | Italy | 1 | 0 | 2 | 3 |
| 9 | Canada | 1 | 0 | 1 | 2 |
| 9 | Slovenia | 1 | 0 | 1 | 2 |
| 11 | Austria | 1 | 0 | 0 | 1 |
| 11 | China | 1 | 0 | 0 | 1 |
| 11 | Ecuador | 1 | 0 | 0 | 1 |
| 14 | New Zealand | 0 | 2 | 0 | 2 |
| 15 | Colombia | 0 | 1 | 1 | 2 |
| 16 | Belgium | 0 | 1 | 0 | 1 |
| 16 | Japan* | 0 | 1 | 0 | 1 |
| 16 | Malaysia | 0 | 1 | 0 | 1 |
| 16 | Ukraine | 0 | 1 | 0 | 1 |
| 16 | Venezuela | 0 | 1 | 0 | 1 |
| 21 | France | 0 | 0 | 2 | 2 |
| 21 | ROC | 0 | 0 | 2 | 2 |
| 23 | Hong Kong | 0 | 0 | 1 | 1 |
| 23 | Spain | 0 | 0 | 1 | 1 |
| Totals (24 entries) | | 22 | 22 | 22 | 66 |

=== Road cycling ===
| Event | Gold | Silver | Bronze |
|---|---|---|---|
| Men's road race | Richard Carapaz; Ecuador | Wout van Aert; Belgium | Tadej Pogačar; Slovenia |
| Men's time trial | Primož Roglič; Slovenia | Tom Dumoulin; Netherlands | Rohan Dennis; Australia |
| Women's road race | Anna Kiesenhofer; Austria | Annemiek van Vleuten; Netherlands | Elisa Longo Borghini; Italy |
| Women's time trial | Annemiek van Vleuten; Netherlands | Marlen Reusser; Switzerland | Anna van der Breggen; Netherlands |

=== Track cycling ===
==== Men's ====
| Event | Gold | Silver | Bronze |
|---|---|---|---|
| Keirin | Jason Kenny; Great Britain | Azizulhasni Awang; Malaysia | Harrie Lavreysen; Netherlands |
| Madison | Denmark; Lasse Norman Hansen; Michael Mørkøv | Great Britain; Ethan Hayter; Matthew Walls | France; Donavan Grondin; Benjamin Thomas |
| Omnium | Matthew Walls; Great Britain | Campbell Stewart; New Zealand | Elia Viviani; Italy |
| Team pursuit | Italy; Simone Consonni; Filippo Ganna; Francesco Lamon; Jonathan Milan | Denmark; Niklas Larsen; Lasse Norman Hansen; Rasmus Pedersen; Frederik Rodenberg | Australia; Leigh Howard; Kelland O'Brien; Luke Plapp; Sam Welsford; Alexander Porter |
| Sprint | Harrie Lavreysen; Netherlands | Jeffrey Hoogland; Netherlands | Jack Carlin; Great Britain |
| Team sprint | Netherlands; Jeffrey Hoogland; Harrie Lavreysen; Roy van den Berg; Matthijs Büchli | Great Britain; Jack Carlin; Jason Kenny; Ryan Owens | France; Florian Grengbo; Rayan Helal; Sébastien Vigier |

==== Women's ====
| Event | Gold | Silver | Bronze |
|---|---|---|---|
| Keirin | Shanne Braspennincx; Netherlands | Ellesse Andrews; New Zealand | Lauriane Genest; Canada |
| Madison | Great Britain; Katie Archibald; Laura Kenny | Denmark; Amalie Dideriksen; Julie Leth | ROC; Gulnaz Khatuntseva; Maria Novolodskaya |
| Omnium | Jennifer Valente; United States | Yumi Kajihara; Japan | Kirsten Wild; Netherlands |
| Team pursuit | Germany; Franziska Brauße; Lisa Brennauer; Lisa Klein; Mieke Kröger | Great Britain; Katie Archibald; Laura Kenny; Neah Evans; Josie Knight; Elinor Barker | United States; Chloé Dygert; Megan Jastrab; Jennifer Valente; Emma White; Lily Williams |
| Sprint | Kelsey Mitchell; Canada | Olena Starikova; Ukraine | Lee Wai Sze; Hong Kong |
| Team sprint | China; Bao Shanju; Zhong Tianshi | Germany; Lea Friedrich; Emma Hinze | ROC; Daria Shmeleva; Anastasia Voynova |

=== Mountain biking ===
| Event | Gold | Silver | Bronze |
|---|---|---|---|
| Men's | Tom Pidcock; Great Britain | Mathias Flückiger; Switzerland | David Valero; Spain |
| Women's | Jolanda Neff; Switzerland | Sina Frei; Switzerland | Linda Indergand; Switzerland |

=== BMX ===
| Event | Gold | Silver | Bronze |
|---|---|---|---|
| Men's race | Niek Kimmann; Netherlands | Kye Whyte; Great Britain | Carlos Ramírez; Colombia |
| Men's freestyle | Logan Martin; Australia | Daniel Dhers; Venezuela | Declan Brooks; Great Britain |
| Women's race | Beth Shriever; Great Britain | Mariana Pajón; Colombia | Merel Smulders; Netherlands |
| Women's freestyle | Charlotte Worthington; Great Britain | Hannah Roberts; United States | Nikita Ducarroz; Switzerland |

== See also ==
- Cycling at the 2018 Asian Games
- Cycling at the 2018 Commonwealth Games
- Cycling at the 2018 Summer Youth Olympics
- Cycling at the 2019 African Games
- Cycling at the 2019 European Games
- Cycling at the 2019 Pan American Games
- Cycling at the 2020 Summer Paralympics
