= Switzerland at the 2020 Summer Olympics =

- IOC code: SUI
- NOC: Swiss Olympic Association
- Website: www.swissolympic.ch (in German and French)

in Tokyo, Japan 23 July 2021 – 8 August 2021
- Competitors: 107 in 19 sports
- Flag bearers (opening): Mujinga Kambundji; Max Heinzer
- Flag bearer (closing): Elena Quirici
- Medals Ranked 24th: Gold 3 Silver 4 Bronze 6 Total 13

Summer Olympics appearances (overview)
- 1896; 1900; 1904; 1908; 1912; 1920; 1924; 1928; 1932; 1936; 1948; 1952; 1956; 1960; 1964; 1968; 1972; 1976; 1980; 1984; 1988; 1992; 1996; 2000; 2004; 2008; 2012; 2016; 2020; 2024

Other related appearances
- 1906 Intercalated Games

Switzerland competed at the 2020 Summer Olympics in Tokyo. Originally scheduled to take place from 24 July to 9 August 2020, the Games were postponed to 23 July to 8 August 2021, because of the COVID-19 pandemic. Swiss athletes have appeared in every edition of the Summer Olympic Games in the modern era, except for a partial boycott of the 1956 Summer Olympics in Melbourne in protest at the Soviet invasion of Hungary.

Switzerland not only repeated its gold medal tally from the previous games but also increased its overall medal tally from 7 medals last time to 13 medals. They won medals in double digit for the first time since 1952 Helsinki.

== Competitors ==
The following is the list of number of competitors in the Games.

Sport	Men	Women	Total
Athletics	5	11	16
Badminton	0	1	1
Canoeing	2	1	3
Cycling	16	6	22
Diving	0	1	1
Equestrian	5	2	7
Fencing	3	0	3
Gymnastics	4	1	5
Judo	1	1	2
Karate	0	1	1
Rowing	6	3	9
Sailing	3	3	6
Shooting	0	2	2
Sport climbing	0	1	1
Swimming	9	4	13
Table tennis	0	1	1
Tennis	1	2	3
Triathlon	2	2	4
Volleyball	2	4	6
Wrestling	1	0	1
Total	60	47	107

== Medalists ==
Medal	Name	Sport	Event	Date
Gold	Jolanda Neff	Cycling	Women's cross-country	27 July
Gold	Nina Christen	Shooting	Women's 50 metre rifle 3 positions	31 July
Gold	Belinda Bencic	Tennis	Women's singles	31 July
Silver	Mathias Flückiger	Cycling	Men's cross-country	26 July
Silver	Sina Frei	Cycling	Women's cross-country	27 July
Silver	Marlen Reusser	Cycling	Women's road time trial	28 July
Silver	Belinda Bencic; Viktorija Golubic	Tennis	Women's doubles	1 August
Bronze	Nina Christen	Shooting	Women's 10 metre air rifle	24 July
Bronze	Linda Indergand	Cycling	Women's cross-country	27 July
Bronze	Jérémy Desplanches	Swimming	Men's 200 metre individual medley	30 July
Bronze	Noè Ponti	Swimming	Men's 100 metre butterfly	31 July
Bronze	Nikita Ducarroz	Cycling	Women's BMX freestyle	1 August
Bronze	Joana Heidrich; Anouk Vergé-Dépré	Volleyball	Women's beach	6 August

Medals by sport
Sport	1st place, gold medalist(s)	2nd place, silver medalist(s)	3rd place, bronze medalist(s)	Total
Cycling	1	3	2	6
Shooting	1	0	1	2
Swimming	0	0	2	2
Tennis	1	1	0	2
Volleyball	0	0	1	1
Total	3	4	6	13

== Athletics ==
Swiss athletes further achieved the entry standards, either by qualifying time or by world ranking, in the following track and field events (up to a maximum of 3 athletes in each event):

Key

- Note–Ranks given for track events are within the athlete's heat only
- Q = Qualified for the next round
- q = Qualified for the next round as a fastest loser or, in field events, by position without achieving the qualifying target
- NR = National record
- N/A = Round not applicable for the event
- Bye = Athlete not required to compete in round

Track & road events
Men

Athlete	Event	Final	
Athlete	Event	Time	Rank
Julien Wanders	10000 m	28:55.29 SB	21
Tadesse Abraham	Marathon	DNF	–

Women

Athlete	Event	Heat		Quarterfinal		Semifinal		Final	
Athlete	Event	Time	Rank	Time	Rank	Time	Rank	Time	Rank
Ajla Del Ponte	100 m	Bye		10.91	2 Q	11.01	2 Q	10.97	5
Mujinga Kambundji	100 m	Bye		10.95	2 Q	10.96	2 Q	10.99	6
Salomé Kora	100 m	Bye		11.25	5	Did not advance			
Mujinga Kambundji	200 m	22.26 =NR	1 Q	—N/a		22.26 =NR	3 Q	22.30	7
Léa Sprunger	400 m hurdles	57.03	6	—N/a		Did not advance			
Ajla del Ponte; Riccarda Dietsche; Mujinga Kambundji; Salome Kora	4 × 100 m relay	42.05 NR	2 Q	—N/a				42.08	4
Yasmin Giger; Silke Lemmens; Rachel Pellaud; Léa Sprunger	4 × 400 m relay	3:25.90 NR	6	—N/a				Did not advance	
Fabienne Schlumpf	Marathon	—N/a						2:31:36	12
Martina Strähl	Marathon	—N/a						2:39:25 SB	51

Field events

Athlete	Event	Qualification		Final	
Athlete	Event	Distance	Position	Distance	Position
Loïc Gasch	Men's high jump	2.21	=23	Did not advance	
Salome Lang	Women's high jump	1.86	=22	Did not advance	
Angelica Moser	Women's pole vault	4.40	20	Did not advance	

== Badminton ==
Switzerland entered one badminton player into the Olympic tournament based on the BWF Race to Tokyo Rankings. Sabrina Jaquet will be competing in her third straight Olympics.

Athlete	Event	Group stage				Elimination	Quarterfinal	Semifinal	Final / BM	
Athlete	Event	Opposition Score	Opposition Score	Opposition Score	Rank	Opposition Score	Opposition Score	Opposition Score	Opposition Score	Rank
Sabrina Jaquet	Women's singles	Tai T-y (TPE); L (7–21, 13–21)	Qi Xf (FRA); L (10–21, 14–21)	Nguyễn (VIE); L (8–21, 17–21)	4	Did not advance				

== Canoeing ==
=== Slalom ===
Swiss canoeists qualified one boat for each of the following classes through the 2019 ICF Canoe Slalom World Championships in La Seu d'Urgell, Spain and the 2021 European Canoe Slalom Championships in Ivrea, Italy. The slalom canoeists were named to the Swiss team on November 11, 2019. The Africa quota was initially reallocated to Hungary, but was further reallocated to Switzerland following the Hungarian Olympic Committee's decision to only send athletes vaccinated against COVID-19 to the Games.

Athlete	Event	Preliminary						Semifinal		Final	
Athlete	Event	Run 1	Rank	Run 2	Rank	Best	Rank	Time	Rank	Time	Rank
Thomas Koechlin	Men's C-1	105.66	10	104.57	10	104.57	12 Q	111.20	13	Did not advance	
Martin Dougoud	Men's K-1	93.70	6	100.58	18	93.70	14 Q	99.28	13	Did not advance	
Alena Marx	Women's C-1	120.12	10	150.84	18	120.12	16 Q	163.09	16	Did not advance	
Naemi Brändle	Women's K-1	230.37	27	135.00	22	135.00	24 Q	121.91	18	Did not advance	

== Cycling ==
=== Road ===
Switzerland entered a squad of five riders (four men and one woman) to compete in their respective Olympic road races, by virtue of their top 50 national finish (for men) and top 22 (for women) in the UCI World Ranking.

Athlete	Event	Time	Rank
Marc Hirschi	Men's road race	6:11.46	25
Stefan Küng	Men's road race	6:15.38	40
Stefan Küng	Men's time trial	56:08:49	4
Gino Mäder	Men's road race	6:21.46	74
Michael Schär	Men's road race	6:13.17	31
Marlen Reusser	Women's road race	4:02:16	46
Marlen Reusser	Women's time trial	31:09:96	2nd place, silver medalist(s)

=== Track ===
Following the completion of the 2020 UCI Track Cycling World Championships, Swiss riders accumulated spots in the men's team pursuit, omnium, and madison based on their country's results in the final UCI Olympic rankings. The Swiss Olympic Association announced the track cycling squad for the Games on May 12, 2021.

Pursuit

Athlete	Event	Qualification		Semifinals		Final	
Athlete	Event	Time	Rank	Opponent Results	Rank	Opponent Results	Rank
Stefan Bissegger; Robin Froidevaux; Mauro Schmid; Valère Thiébaud; Théry Schir; Cyrille Thièry	Men's team pursuit	3:51.514	8	Australia; 3:49.111	7	Great Britain; 3:50.041	8

Omnium

Athlete	Event	Scratch race		Tempo race		Elimination race		Points race		Total points	Rank
Athlete	Event	Rank	Points	Rank	Points	Rank	Points	Rank	Points	Total points	Rank
Théry Schir	Men's omnium	24	9	4	34	3	36	1	15	109	7

Madison

Athlete	Event	Points	Laps	Rank
Robin Froidevaux; Théry Schir	Men's madison	8	0	7

=== Mountain biking ===
Switzerland qualified six mountain bikers, three man and three women, based on the UCI Olympic Mountain Biking rankings.

Athlete	Event	Time	Rank
Filippo Colombo	Men's cross-country	1:28:04	12
Mathias Flückiger	Men's cross-country	1:25:34	2nd place, silver medalist(s)
Nino Schurter	Men's cross-country	1:25:56	4
Sina Frei	Women's cross-country	1:16:57	2nd place, silver medalist(s)
Linda Indergand	Women's cross-country	1:17:05	3rd place, bronze medalist(s)
Jolanda Neff	Women's cross-country	1:15:46	1st place, gold medalist(s)

=== BMX ===
Swiss riders qualified for three quota place (two men and one woman) for BMX at the Olympics, as a result in the UCI BMX Olympic Qualification Ranking List of 1 June 2021.

Race

Athlete	Event	Quarterfinal		Semifinal		Final	
Athlete	Event	Points	Rank	Points	Rank	Result	Rank
Simon Marquart	Men's race	14	5	Did not advance			
David Graf	Men's race	6	2 Q	18	5	Did not advance	

Freestyle

Athlete	Event	Seeding		Final	
Athlete	Event	Score	Rank	Score	Rank
Nikita Ducarroz	Women's freestyle	83.55	3	89.20	3rd place, bronze medalist(s)

== Diving ==
Switzerland sent one diver into the Olympic competition, after finishing the top 18 in the women's springboard at the 2021 FINA Diving World Cup in Tokyo, Japan.

Athlete	Event	Preliminary		Semifinal		Final	
Athlete	Event	Points	Rank	Points	Rank	Points	Rank
Michelle Heimberg	Women's 3 m springboard	289.95	11 Q	289.80	12 Q	283.35	11

== Equestrian ==
Swiss equestrians qualified a full squad in the jumping competition by virtue of a top-six finish at the 2018 FEI World Equestrian Games in Tryon, North Carolina, United States. A team of eventing riders was added to the Swiss equestrian roster by securing an outright berth, as the highest-ranked eligible nation, not yet qualified, in the 2019 Eventing Nations Cup overall rankings. MeanwhIle, one dressage rider was added to the Swiss roster by finishing in the top two, outside the group selection, of the individual FEI Olympic Rankings for Group B (South Western Europe).

=== Dressage ===
Athlete	Horse	Event	Grand Prix		Grand Prix Freestyle		Overall	
Athlete	Horse	Event	Score	Rank	Technical	Artistic	Score	Rank
Estelle Wettstein	West Side Story	Individual	67.748	41	Did not advance			

Qualification Legend: Q = Qualified for the final; q = Qualified for the final as a lucky loser

=== Eventing ===
The Swiss eventing team was named on July 1, 2021. Eveline Bodenmüller and Violine de la Brasserie have been named the travelling alternates.

Athlete	Horse	Event	Dressage		Cross-country			Jumping						Total	
Athlete	Horse	Event	Dressage		Cross-country			Qualifier			Final			Total	
Athlete	Horse	Event	Penalties	Rank	Penalties	Total	Rank	Penalties	Total	Rank	Penalties	Total	Rank	Penalties	Rank
Robin Godel	Jet Set	Individual	37.10	47	Eliminated			Did not advance							
Mélody Johner	Toubleu de Rueire	Individual	36.10	44	0.40	36.50	19	0.00	36.50	14	13.20	49.70	17	49.70	17
Felix Vogg	Colero	Individual	26.70	8	11.80	38.50	21	8.00	46.50	24	5.20	51.70	19	51.70	19
Robin Godel; Mélody Johner; Felix Vogg; Eveline Bodenmüller (s)	Jet Set; Toubleu de Rueire; Colero; Violine de la Brasserie	Team	99.20	10	212.20	311.40	11	8.00+20.00	339.40	10	—N/a			339.40	10

(s) – substituted before jumping – 20 replacement penalties

=== Jumping ===
Bryan Balsiger and Twentytwo des Biches have been named the travelling alternates.

Athlete	Horse	Event	Qualification		Final		
Athlete	Horse	Event	Penalties	Rank	Penalties	Time	Rank
Martin Fuchs	Clooney	Individual	0	=1 Q	8	84.99	16
Steve Guerdat	Venard de Cerisy	Individual	4	=31	Did not advance		
Beat Mändli	Dsarie	Individual	1	=26 Q	Retired		
Bryan Balsiger; Martin Fuchs; Steve Guerdat	Twentytwo des Biches; Clooney; Venard de Cerisy	Team	10	4 Q	28	238.18	5

== Fencing ==
Swiss fencers qualified a full squad each in the men's team épée for the Games by finishing among the top four nations in the FIE Olympic Team Rankings.

Athlete	Event	Round of 64	Round of 32	Round of 16	Quarterfinal	Semifinal	Final / BM	
Athlete	Event	Opposition Score	Opposition Score	Opposition Score	Opposition Score	Opposition Score	Opposition Score	Rank
Benjamin Steffen	Men's épée	Sukhov (ROC); W 15–12	Reizlin (UKR); L 11–15	Did not advance				
Max Heinzer	Men's épée	Bye	Svichkar (UKR); W 15–11	Reizlin (UKR); L 12–15	Did not advance			
Michele Niggeler	Men's épée	Ramirez (USA); L 6–15	Did not advance					
Max Heinzer; Lucas Malcotti; Michele Niggeler; Benjamin Steffen	Men's team épée	—N/a		Bye	South Korea; L 39–44	Classification semifinal France; L 37–45	Seventh place final Italy; L 34–36	8

== Golf ==
Switzerland entered two female golfers into the Olympic tournament. Morgane Métraux qualified but chose not to play. Kim Métraux gained a late place.

Athlete	Event	Round 1	Round 2	Round 3	Round 4	Total		
Athlete	Event	Score	Score	Score	Score	Score	Par	Rank
Kim Métraux	Women's	74	70	74	73	291	+7	54
Albane Valenzuela	Women's	71	69	67	69	276	−8	=18

== Gymnastics ==
=== Artistic ===
Switzerland fielded a full team of five artistic gymnasts (four men and one woman) into the Olympic competition. The men's squad claimed one of the remaining nine spots in the team all-around, while Rio 2016 vault bronze medalist Giulia Steingruber set her third straight trip to the Games, by finishing second out of twenty qualified gymnasts in the individual all-around and apparatus events at the 2019 World Championships in Stuttgart, Germany. The men's team was announced on 24 June 2021.

Men
Team

Athlete	Event	Qualification								Final							
Athlete	Event	Apparatus						Total	Rank	Apparatus						Total	Rank
Athlete	Event	F	PH	R	V	PB	HB	Total	Rank	F	PH	R	V	PB	HB	Total	Rank
Christian Baumann	Team	13.833	12.700	13.766	13.566	15.200	~~12.566~~	81.631	33	—N/a		13.166	—N/a	14.600	13.966	—N/a	
Pablo Brägger	Team	14.133	13.566	13.466	~~12.733~~	15.066	12.600	81.564	35	14.233	13.400	13.466	13.833	14.833	13.933	—N/a	
Benjamin Gischard	Team	14.266	13.833	~~13.333~~	14.166	~~13.800~~	13.100	82.498	26 Q	14.000	13.866	—N/a	14.000	—N/a		—N/a	
Eddy Yusof	Team	~~13.500~~	~~12.466~~	13.533	14.333	14.700	13.366	81.898	31 Q	13.833	13.833	13.666	14.166	14.633	13.500	—N/a	
Total	Team	42.232	40.099	40.765	42.065	44.966	39.066	249.193	7 Q	42.066	41.099	40.298	41.999	44.066	41.399	250.927	6

Individual

Athlete	Event	Qualification								Final							
Athlete	Event	Apparatus						Total	Rank	Apparatus						Total	Rank
Athlete	Event	F	PH	R	V	PB	HB	Total	Rank	F	PH	R	V	PB	HB	Total	Rank
Benjamin Gischard	All-around	See team results								14.300	13.666	13.433	14.300	13.700	13.333	82.732	13
Eddy Yusof	All-around	See team results								13.800	13.866	13.300	13.033	14.533	13.200	81.732	16

Women
Individual

Athlete	Event	Qualification						Final					
Athlete	Event	Apparatus				Total	Rank	Apparatus				Total	Rank
Athlete	Event	V	UB	BB	F	Total	Rank	V	UB	BB	F	Total	Rank
Giulia Steingruber	All-around	14.833	12.800	12.600	13.300	53.533	30 Q	14.833	12.800	12.400	13.333	53.366	15
Giulia Steingruber	Vault	14.566	—N/a			14.566	10	Did not advance					

== Judo ==
Switzerland entered two judoka (one men and one woman) into the Olympic tournament based on the International Judo Federation Olympics Individual Ranking.

Athlete	Event	Round of 64	Round of 32	Round of 16	Quarterfinals	Semifinals	Repechage	Final / BM	
Athlete	Event	Opposition Result	Opposition Result	Opposition Result	Opposition Result	Opposition Result	Opposition Result	Opposition Result	Rank
Nils Stump	Men's −73 kg	Bye	Gjakova (KOS); L 00–11	Did not advance					
Fabienne Kocher	Women's −52 kg	—N/a	Pérez (ESP); W 01–00	Lkhagvasüren (MGL); W 01–00	Pupp (HUN); W 10–00	Buchard (FRA); L 00–10	Bye	Giles (GBR); L 00–10	5

== Karate ==
Switzerland entered one karateka into the inaugural Olympic tournament. Elena Quirici qualified directly for the women's kumite +61 kg category by finishing top three at 2021 World Olympic Qualification Tournament in Paris, France.

Athlete	Event	Round robin					Semifinals	Final	
Athlete	Event	Opposition Result	Opposition Result	Opposition Result	Opposition Result	Rank	Opposition Result	Opposition Result	Rank
Elena Quirici	Women's +61 kg	Matoub (ALG); W 2–1	Abdelaziz (EGY); L 3–3^{+S}	Abbasali (IRI); W 4–0	Gong L (CHN); D 1–1	3	Did not advance		

== Rowing ==
Switzerland qualified four boats for each of the following rowing classes into the Olympic regatta, with the majority of crews confirming Olympic places for their boats at the 2019 FISA World Championships in Ottensheim, Austria.

Men

Athlete	Event	Heats		Repechage		Semifinals		Final	
Athlete	Event	Time	Rank	Time	Rank	Time	Rank	Time	Rank
Barnabé Delarze; Roman Röösli	Double sculls	6:11.24	2 QF	Bye		6:25.89	3 FA	6:09.05	5
Andrin Gulich; Paul Jacquot; Markus Kessler; Joel Schürch	Four	6:04.09	4 R	6:27.80	5 FB	Bye		6:02.32	9

Women

Athlete	Event	Heats		Repechage		Quarterfinals		Semifinals		Final	
Athlete	Event	Time	Rank	Time	Rank	Time	Rank	Time	Rank	Time	Rank
Jeannine Gmelin	Single sculls	7:47.20	2 QF	Bye		8:02.10	2 SA/B	7:25.80	2 FA	7:20.91	5
Patricia Merz; Frédérique Rol	Lightweight double sculls	7:08.66	4 R	7:22.02	1 SA/B	—N/a		6:48.92	4 FB	6:49.16	7

Qualification Legend: FA=Final A (medal); FB=Final B (non-medal); FC=Final C (non-medal); FD=Final D (non-medal); FE=Final E (non-medal); FF=Final F (non-medal); SA/B=Semifinals A/B; SC/D=Semifinals C/D; SE/F=Semifinals E/F; QF=Quarterfinals; R=Repechage

== Sailing ==
Swiss sailors qualified one boat in each of the following classes through the 2018 Sailing World Championships, the class-associated Worlds, and the continental regattas. Additionally, they received an unused berth from Oceania to send the women's 470 crew to the Games based on the results at the 2019 World Championships.

On June 2, 2020, the Swiss Sailing selected Rio 2016 windsurfer Mateo Sanz Lanz, along with skiff crew Lucien Cujean and Sébastien Schneiter, to compete at the Enoshima regatta. The women's 470 crew Linda Fahrni and Maja Siegenthaler was officially named to the Swiss sailing roster on April 1, 2021, while Laser Radial sailor Maud Jayet completed the lineup one month later.

Athlete	Event	Race													Net points	Final rank
Athlete	Event	1	2	3	4	5	6	7	8	9	10	11	12	M*	Net points	Final rank
Mateo Sanz Lanz	Men's RS:X	1	1	9	10	3	4	16	~~17~~	12	10	13	15	6	100	8
Lucien Cujean; Sébastien Schneiter	Men's 49er	16	10	14	10	3	~~20~~	9	9	9	18	13	12	EL	123	14
Maud Jayet	Women's Laser Radial	22	7	22	~~34~~	13	1	21	25	28	24	—N/a		EL	163	19
Linda Fahrni; Maja Siegenthaler	Women's 470	~~12~~	4	8	2	5	10	9	7	12	5	—N/a		2	64	4

M = Medal race; EL = Eliminated – did not advance into the medal race

== Shooting ==
Swiss shooters achieved quota places for the following events by virtue of their best finishes at the 2018 ISSF World Championships, the 2019 ISSF World Cup series, European Championships or Games, and European Qualifying Tournament, as long as they obtained a minimum qualifying score (MQS) by May 31, 2020.

Athlete	Event	Qualification		Final	
Athlete	Event	Points	Rank	Points	Rank
Nina Christen	Women's 10 m air rifle	628.5	7 Q	230.6	3rd place, bronze medalist(s)
Nina Christen	Women's 50 m rifle 3 positions	1174	6 Q	463.9	1st place, gold medalist(s)
Heidi Diethelm Gerber	Women's 10 m air pistol	569	28	Did not advance	
Heidi Diethelm Gerber	Women's 25 m pistol	579	22	Did not advance	

== Sport climbing ==
Switzerland entered one sport climber into the Olympic tournament. Petra Klingler qualified directly for the women's combined event, by advancing to the final and securing one of the seven provisional berths at the 2019 IFSC World Championships in Hachioji, Japan.

Athlete	Event	Qualification									Final								
Athlete	Event	Speed		Boulder		Lead			Total	Rank	Speed		Boulder		Lead			Total	Rank
Athlete	Event	Best	Place	Result	Place	Hold	Time	Place	Total	Rank	Best	Place	Result	Place	Hold	Time	Place	Total	Rank
Petra Klingler	Women's	8.42	10	1T3z 3 8	10	16+	1:49	14	1400.00	16	did not advance								

== Swimming ==
Swiss swimmers further achieved qualifying standards in the following events (up to a maximum of 2 swimmers in each event at the Olympic Qualifying Time (OQT), and potentially 1 at the Olympic Selection Time (OST)):

Men

Athlete	Event	Heat		Semifinal		Final	
Athlete	Event	Time	Rank	Time	Rank	Time	Rank
Jérémy Desplanches	100 m breaststroke	1:00.29	28	Did not advance			
Jérémy Desplanches	200 m individual medley	1:56.89	2 Q	1:57.38	5 Q	1:56.17	3rd place, bronze medalist(s)
Antonio Djakovic	200 m freestyle	1:46.37	15 Q	1:45.92	11	Did not advance	
Antonio Djakovic	400 m freestyle	3:45.82 NR	9	—N/a		Did not advance	
Roman Mityukov	100 m freestyle	48.43	15 Q	48.53	16	Did not advance	
Roman Mityukov	200 m backstroke	1:57.45	11 Q	1:57.07	13	Did not advance	
Noè Ponti	100 m butterfly	51.24	5 Q	50.76	3 Q	50.74 NR	3rd place, bronze medalist(s)
Noè Ponti	200 m butterfly	1:55.05	5 Q	1:55.37	10	Did not advance	
Antonio Djakovic; Nils Liess; Roman Mityukov; Noè Ponti	4 × 100 m freestyle relay	3:14.65	14	—N/a		Did not advance	
Antonio Djakovic; Nils Liess; Roman Mityukov; Noè Ponti	4 × 200 m freestyle relay	7:06.59	6 Q	—N/a		7:06.12	6

Women

Athlete	Event	Heat		Semifinal		Final	
Athlete	Event	Time	Rank	Time	Rank	Time	Rank
Lisa Mamié	100 m breaststroke	1:06.76	13 Q	1:07.41	15	Did not advance	
Lisa Mamié	200 m breaststroke	2:23.91	14 Q	2:25.11	14	Did not advance	
Maria Ugolkova	100 m freestyle	54.86	26	Did not advance			
Maria Ugolkova	200 m individual medley	2:10.04	5 Q	2:10.65	9	Did not advance	

== Table tennis ==
For the first time since Atlanta 1996, Switzerland entered an athlete into the table tennis competition at the Games, based on the World Rankings as of June 1, 2021.

Athlete	Event	Preliminary	Round 1	Round 2	Round 3	Round of 16	Quarterfinals	Semifinals	Final / BM	
Athlete	Event	Opposition Result	Opposition Result	Opposition Result	Opposition Result	Opposition Result	Opposition Result	Opposition Result	Opposition Result	Rank
Rachel Moret	Women's singles	Bye	Yamada (BRA); W 4–2	Póta (HUN); W 4–1	Chen M (CHN); L 0–4	Did not advance				

== Tennis ==
Athlete	Event	Round of 64	Round of 32	Round of 16	Quarterfinals	Semifinals	Final / BM	
Athlete	Event	Opposition Score	Opposition Score	Opposition Score	Opposition Score	Opposition Score	Opposition Score	Rank
Belinda Bencic	Women's singles	Pegula (USA); W 6–3, 6–3	Doi (JPN); W 6–2, 6–4	Krejčíková (CZE); W 1–6, 6–2, 6–3	Pavlyuchenkova (ROC); W 6–0, 3–6, 6–3	Rybakina (KAZ); W 7–6^{(7–2)}, 4–6, 6–3	Vondroušová (CZE); W 7–5, 2–6, 6–3	1st place, gold medalist(s)
Viktorija Golubic	Women's singles	Osorio (COL); W 6–4, 6–1	Osaka (JPN); L 3–6, 2–6	Did not advance				
Belinda Bencic; Viktorija Golubic	Women's doubles	—N/a	Aoyama / Shibahara (JPN); W 6–4, 6–7^{(5–7)}, [10–5]	Muguruza / Suárez (ESP); W 3–6, 6–1, [11–9]	Perez / Stosur (AUS); W 6–4, 6–4	Pigossi / Stefani (BRA); W 7–5, 6–3	Krejčíková / Siniaková (CZE); L 5–7, 1–6	2nd place, silver medalist(s)

== Triathlon ==
Switzerland qualified for the Mixed Relay events by finishing third at the 2021 World Triathlon Mixed Relay Olympic Qualification Event in Lisbon on May 21, 2021.

Individual

Athlete	Event	Time						Rank
Athlete	Event	Swim (1.5 km)	Trans 1	Bike (40 km)	Trans 2	Run (10 km)	Total	Rank
Andrea Salvisberg	Men's	18:02	0:40	56:03	0:30	32:10	1:47:25	22
Max Studer	Men's	18:25	0:39	55:59	0:28	30:35	1:46:06	9
Jolanda Annen	Women's	19:32	0:44	1:05:04	0:35	35:36	2:01:31	19
Nicola Spirig	Women's	19:32	0:43	1:02:50	0:32	34:28	1:58:05	6

Relay

Athlete	Event	Time						Rank
Athlete	Event	Swim (300 m)	Trans 1	Bike (7 km)	Trans 2	Run (2 km)	Total group	Rank
Andrea Salvisberg	Mixed relay	3:59	0:37	9:35	0:28	5:44	20:23	—N/a
Max Studer	Mixed relay	4:11	0:37	9:50	0:29	5:33	20:40	—N/a
Jolanda Annen	Mixed relay	3:51	0:40	10:32	0:30	6:27	22:00	—N/a
Nicola Spirig	Mixed relay	4:35	0:40	10:20	0:30	6:19	22:24	—N/a
Total	Mixed relay	—N/a					1:25:27	7

== Volleyball ==
=== Beach ===
Swiss women's beach volleyball pair qualified for the Games, as the result in the FIVB Beach volleyball Olympic Ranking List of 13 June 2021.

Athlete	Event	Preliminary round				Repechage	Round of 16	Quarterfinals	Semifinals	Final / BM	
Athlete	Event	Opposition Score	Opposition Score	Opposition Score	Rank	Opposition Score	Opposition Score	Opposition Score	Opposition Score	Opposition Score	Rank
Mirco Gerson; Adrian Heidrich	Men's	Ahmed / Cherif (QAT); L (17–21, 16–21)	Bourne / Gibb (USA); L (19–21, 21–23)	Carambula / Rossi (ITA); W (21–14, 24–26, 15–13)	3 R	E Grimalt / M Grimalt (CHI); L (17–21, 18–21)	Did not advance				
Nina Betschart; Tanja Hüberli	Women's	Kozuch / Ludwig (GER); W (23–25, 22–20, 16–14)	Hermannová / Sluková (CZE); W (21–0, 21–0)	Ishii / Murakami (JPN); W (14–21, 21–19, 15–12)	1 Q	Bye	Heidrich / Vergé-Dépré (SUI); L (12–21, 21–19, 21–23)	Did not advance			
Joana Heidrich; Anouk Vergé-Dépré	Women's	Borger / Sude (GER); W (21–8, 21–23, 15–6)	Schoon / Stam (NED); W (22–20, 21–18)	Humana-Paredes / Pavan (CAN); L (13–21, 22–24)	2	Bye	Betschart / Hüberli (SUI); W (21–12, 19–21, 23–21)	Ana Patrícia / Rebecca (BRA); W (21–19, 18–21, 15–12)	Klineman / Ross (USA); L (12–21, 11–21)	Graudiņa / Kravčenoka (LAT); W (21–19, 21–15)	3rd place, bronze medalist(s)

== Wrestling ==
For the first time since London 2012, Switzerland qualified one wrestler for the men's freestyle 86 kg into the Olympic competition, as a result of his top six finish at the 2019 World Championships.

Key:

- VF (ranking points: 5–0 or 0–5) – Victory by fall.
- VB (ranking points: 5–0 or 0–5) – Victory by injury (VF for forfeit, VA for withdrawal or disqualification)
- PP (ranking points: 3–1 or 1–3) – Decision by points – the loser with technical points.
- PO (ranking points: 3–0 or 0–3) – Decision by points – the loser without technical points.
- ST (ranking points: 4–0 or 0–4) – Great superiority – the loser without technical points and a margin of victory of at least 8 (Greco-Roman) or 10 (freestyle) points.
- SP (ranking points: 4–1 or 1–4) – Technical superiority – the loser with technical points and a margin of victory of at least 8 (Greco-Roman) or 10 (freestyle) points.

Freestyle

Athlete	Event	Round of 16	Quarterfinal	Semifinal	Repechage	Final / BM	
Athlete	Event	Opposition Result	Opposition Result	Opposition Result	Opposition Result	Opposition Result	Rank
Stefan Reichmuth	Men's −86 kg	Benferdjallah (ALG); W 3–1 ^{PP}	Yazdani (IRI); L 1–4 ^{PP}	Did not advance	Shapiev (UZB); L 1–3 ^{PP}	Did not advance	8
