= Cycling at the 2020 Summer Olympics – Men's individual road race =

Men's individual road race at the Games of the XXXII Olympiad
- Olympic cycling
- Venues: Musashinonomori Park; Fuji Speedway; 234 km (145.4 mi)
- Date: 24 July 2021
- Competitors: 128 from 57 nations
- Winning time: 6:05:26

Medalists
1st place, gold medalist(s)		Richard Carapaz	Ecuador
2nd place, silver medalist(s)		Wout van Aert	Belgium
3rd place, bronze medalist(s)		Tadej Pogačar	Slovenia

The men's individual road race event at the 2020 Summer Olympics took place on 24 July 2021 on a course starting at Musashinonomori Park in Tokyo, and ending at the Fuji Speedway in Shizuoka Prefecture. 128 cyclists from 57 nations competed, with 85 completing the course.

The race was won by Richard Carapaz of Ecuador. Carapaz, along with Brandon McNulty of the United States, attacked with 25 kilometres (16 mi) to go and immediately built a gap over the chasing group. Both riders worked together until Carapaz dropped McNulty with 5.8 kilometres (3.6 mi) to go. Carapaz held off the chase group to win the race by more than a minute. The silver and bronze medals went to Wout van Aert of Belgium and Tadej Pogačar of Slovenia, respectively. Both riders were part of the 11-man chase group that rode in pursuit of Carapaz and McNulty. Eight of the 11 riders contested the sprint for the silver medal, with van Aert holding off Pogačar to take second.

== Background ==
This was the 21st appearance of the event, initially held in 1896 and then at every Summer Olympics since 1936. It replaced the individual time trial event that had been held from 1912 to 1932; the time trial was re-introduced in 1996 alongside the road race.

== Qualification ==
A National Olympic Committee (NOC) could enter up to five qualified cyclists in the men's individual road race. All quota places are assigned to the NOC, which may select the cyclists that compete. There were 130 total quota spots available for the race, which were allocated in a multi-step process:

1. 122 spots were assigned through the UCI world ranking by nations. This ranking included Elite and U-23 men's races for the 2019 season (22 October 2018 to 22 October 2019). The top six nations each received the maximum of five quota places: Belgium, Italy, the Netherlands, France, Colombia, and Spain. Nations ranked 7th through 13th each received four quota places, 14th through 21st each received three quota places, 22nd through 32nd each received two quota places, and 33rd through 50th each received one quota place.
2. A special rule provided an opportunity for individuals ranked in the top 200 but whose nation was not in the top 50 to earn places (which would replace the lowest ranked nations), but there were no eligible individuals.
3. The next six quota places were assigned through the 2019 African, Asian, and Pan-American championships; at each championship, among the nations not yet qualified, the two nations with the highest-placed road race cyclist earned spots. These were taken by Burkina Faso and Namibia in Africa, Chinese Taipei and Uzbekistan in Asia, and Peru and Panama in the Americas. Burkina Faso and Panama made their debut in the event.
4. The final two quota places were reserved for the host nation; if the host nation had already earned one or two places, they would be reallocated through the UCI world rankings. In this case, Japan had earned one quota place through standard qualification, and so they received only one of the host places, while the other was reallocated to 51st-ranked Hong Kong. Because this allocation was complete by 22 October 2019, it was unaffected by the COVID-19 pandemic.
5. Shortly before the games, Sweden withdrew their athlete, who was replaced with Josip Rumac from 52nd-ranked Croatia.
6. On 18 July, Daniel Martínez from Colombia could not travel to Tokyo after continuing to test positive for COVID-19. On 23 July, Rohan Dennis of Australia decided to skip the road race to focus on the individual time trial. These riders were removed from the start list and were not replaced.

Finally, both Simon Geschke of Germany and Michal Schlegel of the Czech Republic did not start the race after testing positive for COVID-19 the day before the race.

== Competition format and course ==
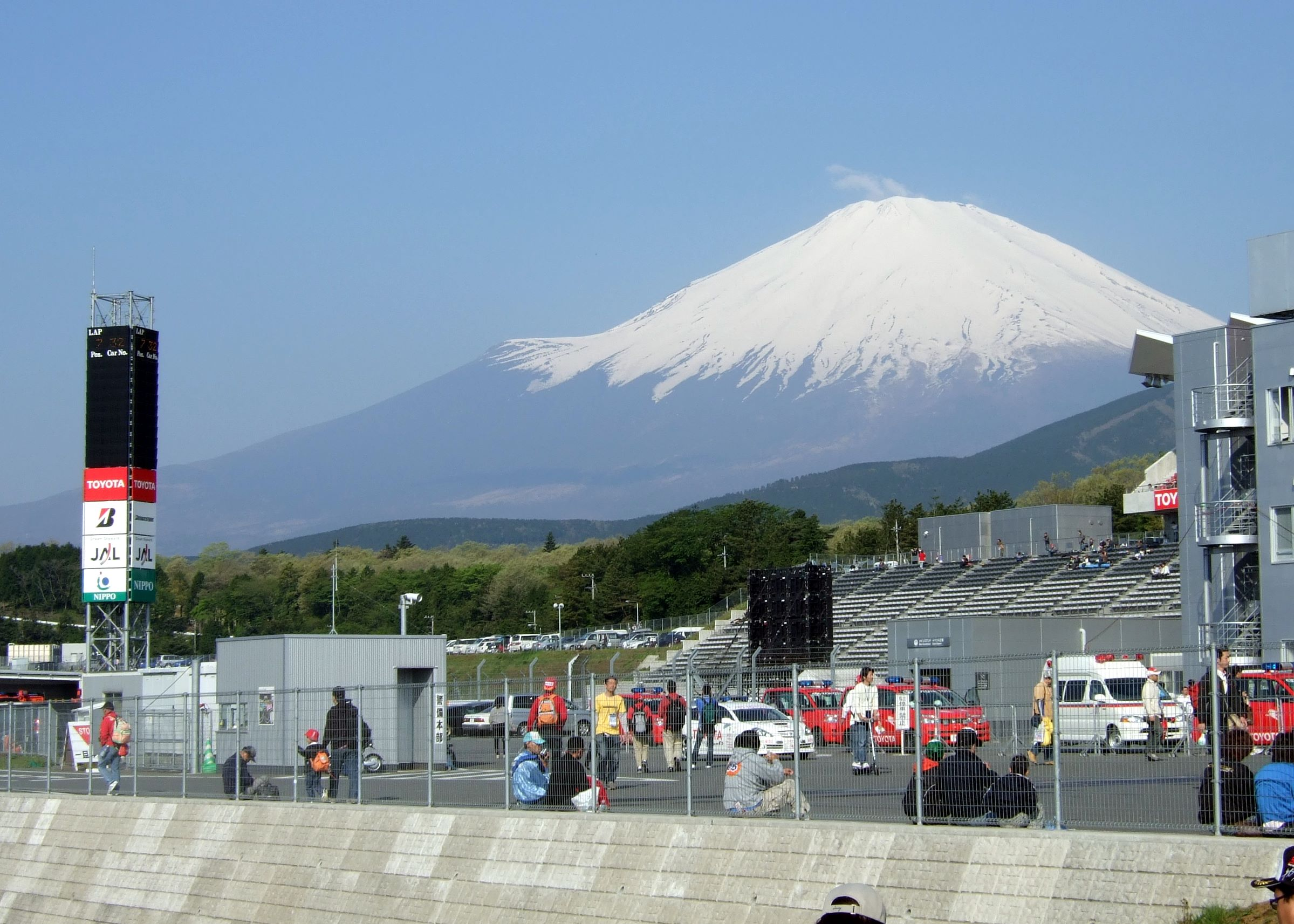
Mount Fuji from the Fuji Speedway

The road race was a mass-start, one-day road race event. The courses for the men's and women's road races were revealed in August 2018. The men's race started at Musashinonomori Park in Chōfu, western Tokyo, at 11:00 Japan Standard Time (UTC+9) and finished at the Fuji Speedway circuit in the Shizuoka prefecture. The race was 234 kilometres (145 mi) long with a total elevation gain of 4,865 metres (15,961 ft).

The first part of the men's and women's races were identical. The course first passed through the mostly flat outskirts of Tokyo's metropolitan area. After 40 kilometres (25 mi), the riders gradually climbed towards the foot of the climb to Doushi Road, a 5.9-kilometre (3.7 mi) climb with an average gradient of 5.7 percent. The climb topped out after 80 kilometres (50 mi) of racing at an altitude of 1,121 metres (3,678 ft) above sea level. After reaching Lake Yamanakako in Yamanashi and crossing the Kagosaka Pass, the riders faced a 15-kilometre (9.3 mi) descent and from here, the courses were different for the men's and women's races.

After the descent, the men's race headed towards the lower slopes of Mount Fuji, Japan's highest mountain, where they went up the 14.3-kilometre (8.9 mi) long climb of Fuji Sanroku with an average incline of six percent. The climb was crested with 96.5 kilometres (60.0 mi) left at an elevation of 1,451 metres (4,760 ft) before the riders faced a 15.5-kilometre (9.6 mi) long descent into Gotemba. Afterwards, the riders headed towards the Fuji Speedway section, where they crossed the finish line twice before reaching the foot of the Mikuni Pass. The climb was 6.5 kilometres (4.0 mi) long with an average gradient of 10.6 percent and included sections reaching 20 percent. It was expected to be the decisive climb in the race. The peak, at an altitude of 1,171 metres (3,842 ft), was crested with about 33 kilometres (21 mi) to go. After the climb, the race returned to Lake Yamanakako and the Kagosaka Pass before a final descent and a short hilly section towards the finish on the Fuji Speedway circuit.

== Start list ==
Nations:

Cyclists	Nations
5	Belgium - Spain - France - Italy - Netherlands
4	Colombia - Denmark - Great Britain - Germany - Norway - Slovenia - Switzerland
3	Australia - Austria - Canada - Czech Republic - Ireland - Kazakhstan - Poland - ROC - South Africa
2	12 nations
1	24 nations

== Race overview ==
As soon as the race started, a group of eight riders broke away from the peloton. The group comprised Nicholas Dlamini (South Africa), Michael Kukrle (Czech Republic), Juraj Sagan (Slovakia), Polychronis Tzortzakis (Greece), Eduard-Michael Grosu (Romania), Orluis Aular (Venezuela), Paul Daumont (Burkina Faso), and Elchin Asadov (Azerbaijan). The break reached a maximum advantage of around 19 minutes before the peloton began its pursuit, with defending Olympic champion Greg Van Avermaet (Belgium) and Jan Tratnik (Slovenia), in particular, leading the chase. On the gradual uphill section ahead of the climb to Doushi Road, Tristan de Lange (Namibia) attacked from the peloton but he was eventually caught. With around 150 kilometres (93 mi) to go, a crash took place in the peloton, taking down the Great Britain duo of Geraint Thomas and Tao Geoghegan Hart as well as Giulio Ciccone (Italy) and Gregor Mühlberger (Austria). All riders eventually managed to get back up and return to the peloton. Up front, the break was reduced to five riders – Aular, Dlamini, Tzortzakis, Kukrle, and Sagan – after the first climb. The group led the peloton by around 16 minutes.

As the race reached the foot of Fuji Sanroku, Van Avermaet and Tratnik continued to lead the chase as the break started the climb with a lead of around 13 1/2 minutes. Patrick Bevin (New Zealand) went to the front to help with the chase and the break's lead gradually decreased as the climb went on while further up the ascent, Van Avermaet began to get dropped along with several other riders. Near the top, Ciccone took over at the front of the peloton to set a faster tempo. Some of the notable riders to struggle on the climb include the Spanish duo of Omar Fraile and Alejandro Valverde. The break reached the top of Fuji Sanroku with a lead of almost six minutes. Tratnik soon made his way back to the front of the peloton to gradually eat into the break's advantage, with the break reaching the Fuji Speedway with a lead of around four minutes. At the start of the circuit, several riders began to abandon the race, most notably Thomas, Van Avermaet and Fraile.

After the first passage through the finish line, attacks lit up the peloton as Damiano Caruso (Italy), Wilco Kelderman (Netherlands), and Mauri Vansevenant (Belgium) rode away. After the three riders were caught, Remco Evenepoel (Belgium) instigated another attack and brought Vincenzo Nibali (Italy) and Eddie Dunbar (Ireland) with him. Meanwhile, up front, the break began to splinter as Sagan and Dlamini couldn't continue with the quick pace and the peloton edged closer to them. The trio of Evenepoel, Nibali, and Dunbar was soon brought back. As the race reached the Fuji Speedway for the second time, the remnants of the original break were finally caught, with the peloton setting themselves up for the decisive climb of the race, the Mikuni Pass.

As the peloton reached the foot of the Mikuni Pass, Italy stationed themselves up front before Tiesj Benoot (Belgium) began to set a furious pace. After Benoot's work was done, his compatriot Vansevenant continued to set a fast tempo as the peloton continued to thin out. With around 37.4 kilometres (23.2 mi) to go, Tadej Pogačar (Slovenia) put in a seated acceleration. Brandon McNulty (United States) and Michael Woods (Canada) followed his move while Wout van Aert (Belgium) led the chase group. The trio led by around 20 seconds before riders began to bridge up front. Near the top, the front group struggled with cooperation as the group including van Aert managed to make it across. As the group made its way back to Lake Yamanakako and the Kagosaka Pass, several riders attacked off the front. Bauke Mollema (Netherlands) and Jakob Fuglsang (Denmark) tried to initiate some attacks but the moves were brought back.

With 25 kilometres (16 mi) to go, Brandon McNulty accelerated off the front with Richard Carapaz (Ecuador) responding to the move. The duo began to increase their advantage as the chase group suffered from a lack of cooperation, with van Aert leading much of the chase. The duo's advantage reached more than 40 seconds before van Aert produced a searing acceleration on a short uphill rise with around 12 kilometres (7.5 mi) to go. The lead was soon down to 13 seconds with 7 kilometres (4.3 mi) to go. With 5.8 kilometres (3.6 mi) left, Carapaz dropped McNulty to solo off the front. After McNulty was caught by the chase group, the riders continued to attack each other, allowing Carapaz to increase his lead once again. Carapaz would not be caught as he won the gold medal, his country's second in history. With gold already taken, the chase group set themselves up for the sprint for the silver and bronze medals, resulting in an 8-way race for the finish in the final metres of the race, which was initiated by Adam Yates (Great Britain). Van Aert and Pogačar prevailed in the sprint, taking silver and bronze respectively. The gap between second and ninth places was within a single second.

== Results ==
Result
Rank	#	Cyclist	Nation	Time	Diff.
1st place, gold medalist(s)	60	Richard Carapaz	Ecuador	6:05:26	
2nd place, silver medalist(s)	4	Wout van Aert	Belgium	6:06:33	+ 1:07
3rd place, bronze medalist(s)	6	Tadej Pogačar	Slovenia	6:06:33	+ 1:07
4	32	Bauke Mollema	Netherlands	6:06:33	+ 1:07
5	79	Michael Woods	Canada	6:06:33	+ 1:07
6	87	Brandon McNulty	United States	6:06:33	+ 1:07
7	13	David Gaudu	France	6:06:33	+ 1:07
8	38	Rigoberto Urán	Colombia	6:06:33	+ 1:07
9	23	Adam Yates	Great Britain	6:06:33	+ 1:07
10	50	Maximilian Schachmann	Germany	6:06:47	+ 1:21
11	70	Michał Kwiatkowski	Poland	6:07:01	+ 1:35
12	44	Jakob Fuglsang	Denmark	6:08:09	+ 2:43
13	55	João Almeida	Portugal	6:09:04	+ 3:38
14	24	Alberto Bettiol	Italy	6:09:04	+ 3:38
15	33	Dylan van Baarle	Netherlands	6:09:04	+ 3:38
16	58	Dan Martin	Ireland	6:09:04	+ 3:38
17	22	Simon Yates	Great Britain	6:09:04	+ 3:38
18	83	Patrick Konrad	Austria	6:09:04	+ 3:38
19	71	Rafał Majka	Poland	6:09:06	+ 3:40
20	27	Gianni Moscon	Italy	6:09:08	+ 3:42
21	91	Alexey Lutsenko	Kazakhstan	6:11:46	+ 6:20
22	99	Toms Skujiņš	Latvia	6:11:46	+ 6:20
23	17	Gorka Izagirre	Spain	6:11:46	+ 6:20
24	25	Damiano Caruso	Italy	6:11:46	+ 6:20
25	51	Marc Hirschi	Switzerland	6:11:46	+ 6:20
26	72	George Bennett	New Zealand	6:11:46	+ 6:20
27	14	Guillaume Martin	France	6:11:46	+ 6:20
28	8	Primož Roglič	Slovenia	6:11:46	+ 6:20
29	48	Emanuel Buchmann	Germany	6:11:46	+ 6:20
30	85	Hermann Pernsteiner	Austria	6:13:17	+ 7:51
31	54	Michael Schär	Switzerland	6:13:17	+ 7:51
32	62	Pavel Sivakov	ROC	6:13:17	+ 7:51
33	98	Krists Neilands	Latvia	6:15:38	+ 10:12
34	66	Markus Hoelgaard	Norway	6:15:38	+ 10:12
35	111	Yukiya Arashiro	Japan	6:15:38	+ 10:12
36	80	Michael Kukrle	Czech Republic	6:15:38	+ 10:12
37	100	Kevin Geniets	Luxembourg	6:15:38	+ 10:12
38	12	Kenny Elissonde	France	6:15:38	+ 10:12
39	110	Eder Frayre	Mexico	6:15:38	+ 10:12
40	52	Stefan Küng	Switzerland	6:15:38	+ 10:12
41	56	Nelson Oliveira	Portugal	6:15:38	+ 10:12
42	19	Alejandro Valverde	Spain	6:15:38	+ 10:12
43	7	Jan Polanc	Slovenia	6:15:38	+ 10:12
44	29	Tom Dumoulin	Netherlands	6:15:38	+ 10:12
45	34	Esteban Chaves	Colombia	6:15:38	+ 10:12
46	94	Tanel Kangert	Estonia	6:15:38	+ 10:12
47	61	Jhonatan Narváez	Ecuador	6:15:38	+ 10:12
48	42	Richie Porte	Australia	6:15:38	+ 10:12
49	3	Remco Evenepoel	Belgium	6:15:38	+ 10:12
50	96	Amanuel Ghebreigzabhier	Eritrea	6:15:38	+ 10:12
51	31	Wilco Kelderman	Netherlands	6:15:38	+ 10:12
52	74	Stefan de Bod	South Africa	6:16:53	+ 11:27
53	28	Vincenzo Nibali	Italy	6:16:53	+ 11:27
54	47	Nikias Arndt	Germany	6:16:53	+ 11:27
55	97	Merhawi Kudus	Eritrea	6:16:53	+ 11:27
56	93	Anatoliy Budyak	Ukraine	6:16:53	+ 11:27
57	11	Benoît Cosnefroy	France	6:16:53	+ 11:27
58	2	Tiesj Benoot	Belgium	6:16:53	+ 11:27
59	63	Aleksandr Vlasov	ROC	6:16:53	+ 11:27
60	26	Giulio Ciccone	Italy	6:16:53	+ 11:27
61	65	Tobias Foss	Norway	6:16:53	+ 11:27
62	16	Jesús Herrada	Spain	6:16:53	+ 11:27
63	108	Polychronis Tzortzakis	Greece	6:21:46	+ 16:20
64	124	Muradjan Khalmuratov	Uzbekistan	6:21:46	+ 16:20
65	77	Guillaume Boivin	Canada	6:21:46	+ 16:20
66	102	Aleksandr Riabushenko	Belarus	6:21:46	+ 16:20
67	9	Jan Tratnik	Slovenia	6:21:46	+ 16:20
68	126	Andrey Amador	Costa Rica	6:21:46	+ 16:20
69	37	Nairo Quintana	Colombia	6:21:46	+ 16:20
70	84	Gregor Mühlberger	Austria	6:21:46	+ 16:20
71	41	Lucas Hamilton	Australia	6:21:46	+ 16:20
72	40	Luke Durbridge	Australia	6:21:46	+ 16:20
73	101	Michel Ries	Luxembourg	6:21:46	+ 16:20
74	53	Gino Mäder	Switzerland	6:21:46	+ 16:20
75	59	Nicolas Roche	Ireland	6:21:46	+ 16:20
76	57	Eddie Dunbar	Ireland	6:21:46	+ 16:20
77	5	Mauri Vansevenant	Belgium	6:21:46	+ 16:20
78	45	Michael Valgren	Denmark	6:21:46	+ 16:20
79	18	Ion Izagirre	Spain	6:21:46	+ 16:20
80	86	Lawson Craddock	United States	6:21:46	+ 16:20
81	35	Sergio Higuita	Colombia	6:21:46	+ 16:20
82	67	Tobias Halland Johannessen	Norway	6:25:12	+ 19:46
83	68	Andreas Leknessund	Norway	6:25:12	+ 19:46
84	112	Nariyuki Masuda	Japan	6:25:16	+ 19:50
85	78	Hugo Houle	Canada	6:25:16	+ 19:50
—	123	Eduardo Sepúlveda	Argentina	DNF	
—	92	Vadim Pronskiy	Kazakhstan	DNF	
—	107	Attila Valter	Hungary	DNF	
—	76	Ryan Gibbons	South Africa	DNF	
—	75	Nicholas Dlamini	South Africa	DNF	
—	116	Orluis Aular	Venezuela	DNF	
—	10	Rémi Cavagna	France	DNF	
—	88	Juraj Sagan	Slovakia	DNF	
—	21	Geraint Thomas	Great Britain	DNF	
—	69	Maciej Bodnar	Poland	DNF	
—	64	Ilnur Zakarin	ROC	DNF	
—	95	Peeter Pruus	Estonia	DNF	
—	82	Zdeněk Štybar	Czech Republic	DNF	
—	119	Josip Rumac	Croatia	DNF	
—	46	Christopher Juul-Jensen	Denmark	DNF	
—	113	Manuel Rodas	Guatemala	DNF	
—	15	Omar Fraile	Spain	DNF	
—	1	Greg Van Avermaet	Belgium	DNF	
—	109	Christofer Jurado	Panama	DNF	
—	89	Lukáš Kubiš	Slovakia	DNF	
—	103	Azzedine Lagab	Algeria	DNF	
—	105	Eduard-Michael Grosu	Romania	DNF	
—	120	Paul Daumont	Burkina Faso	DNF	
—	43	Kasper Asgreen	Denmark	DNF	
—	129	Feng Chun-kai	Chinese Taipei	DNF	
—	20	Tao Geoghegan Hart	Great Britain	DNF	
—	125	Mohcine El Kouraji	Morocco	DNF	
—	90	Dmitriy Gruzdev	Kazakhstan	DNF	
—	73	Patrick Bevin	New Zealand	DNF	
—	122	Saeid Safarzadeh	Iran	DNF	
—	30	Yoeri Havik	Netherlands	DNF	
—	130	Choy Hiu Fung	Hong Kong	DNF	
—	128	Royner Navarro	Peru	DNF	
—	104	Hamza Mansouri	Algeria	DNF	
—	106	Evaldas Šiškevičius	Lithuania	DNF	
—	114	Moise Mugisha	Rwanda	DNF	
—	115	Tristan de Lange	Namibia	DNF	
—	117	Onur Balkan	Turkey	DNF	
—	118	Ahmet Örken	Turkey	DNF	
—	121	Wang Ruidong	China	DNF	
—	127	Elchin Asadov	Azerbaijan	DNF	
—	49	Simon Geschke	Germany	DNS	
—	81	Michal Schlegel	Czech Republic	DNS	
