= Cycling at the 2020 Summer Olympics – Women's individual road race =

Women's individual road race at the Games of the XXXII Olympiad
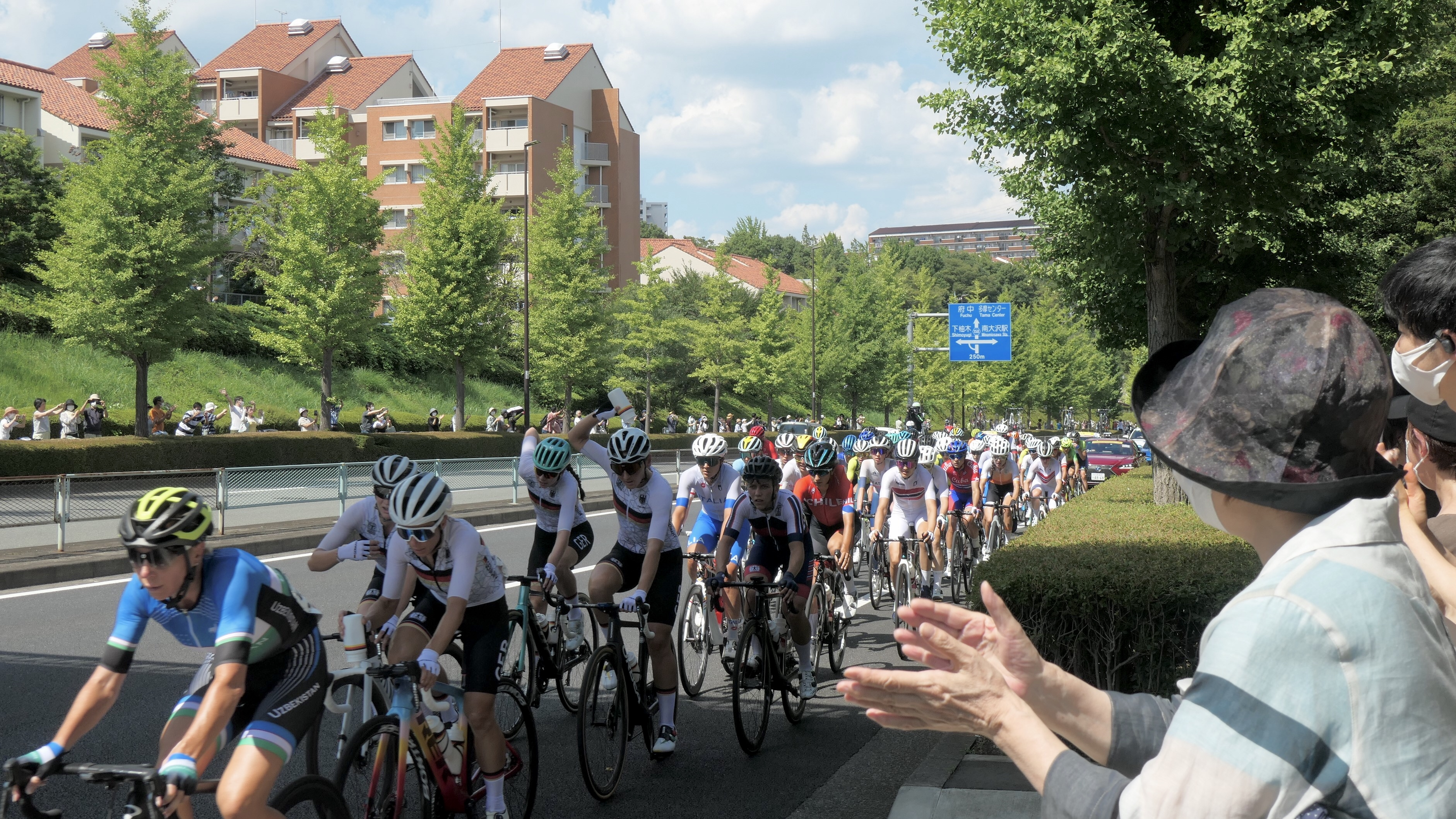
- Women's individual road race
- Venues: Musashinonomori Park; Fuji Speedway
- Date: 25 July 2021
- Competitors: 67 from 40 nations
- Winning time: 3h 52' 45"

Medalists
1st place, gold medalist(s)		Anna Kiesenhofer; Austria
2nd place, silver medalist(s)		Annemiek van Vleuten; Netherlands
3rd place, bronze medalist(s)		Elisa Longo Borghini; Italy

The women's individual road race event at the 2020 Summer Olympics was held on 25 July 2021 on a course starting at Musashinonomori Park in Tokyo and ending at the Fuji Speedway in Shizuoka Prefecture. 67 cyclists from 40 nations competed, with 48 completing the course.

The race was won by rank outsider Anna Kiesenhofer of Austria. Kiesenhofer was part of the original breakaway, powering away at the very start of the race along with four other riders. She proceeded to drop her breakaway companions, all of whom were swallowed up by the peloton, soloing off the front at the Kagosaka Pass with 41 kilometres (25 mi) to go and holding off the late chase from the pack. She won by 1' 15" over the silver medalist, Annemiek van Vleuten of the Netherlands.

Van Vleuten made a late attack with 2.1 kilometres (1.3 mi) to go, distancing the remnants of the peloton. She celebrated after crossing the line, having mistakenly thought that all the breakaway riders had been caught and that she had won gold. The bronze medal went to Elisa Longo Borghini of Italy, after unsuccessfully attempting to bridge up to van Vleuten's attack and holding off the peloton.

The Olympic road races are unusual in the modern professional circuit in the complete absence of team radios, an anomaly which, together with Kiesenhofer's relative anonymity in the peloton, factored heavily into the shock outcome of the 2021 race. Approaching the line, the peloton appeared unaware that the unheralded Kiesenhofer had been one of the escapees, had stayed off the front and finished the race substantially ahead of them.

Kiesenhofer's win was considered a huge upset; she had trained for the event without a coach or a professional team, and was not viewed as a meaningful contender to win a medal. Her solo victory was described as one of the biggest upsets in Olympics history.

== Background ==
This was the 10th appearance of the event, which has been held at every Summer Olympics since 1984. The reigning Olympic champion was Anna van der Breggen of the Netherlands.

== Qualification ==
A National Olympic Committee (NOC) could enter up to four qualified cyclists in the women's individual road race. All quota places are assigned to the NOC, which may select the cyclists that compete. There were 67 total quota spots available for the race. The assignments of spots to NOCs was a multi-stage process:

1. First, 62 places were assigned through the UCI world ranking by nations. This ranking included Elite and U-23 women's races for the 2019 season (22 October 2018 to 22 October 2019). The top five nations each received the maximum of four quota places: the Netherlands, Italy, Germany, the United States, and Australia. Nations ranked 6th through 13th each received three quota places, and 14th through 22nd each received two quota places.
2. Next, a special rule provided an opportunity for individuals ranked in the top 100 but whose nation was not in the top 22 to earn places (which would replace the lowest ranked nations). There were 17 eligible individuals. Their places were deducted from the lower-ranked nations: this reduced all of the 14th–22nd nations to one quota place each and all of the 6th–13th nations to two places each.
3. Three more quota places were assigned through the 2019 African, Asian, and Pan-American championships; at each championship, among nations that were not yet qualified, the one with the highest placed road race cyclist earned a spot; these were taken by Ethiopia, South Korea, and Paraguay, respectively.
4. The final two quota places were reserved for the host nation; if the host nation had already earned one or two places, they would be reallocated through the UCI world rankings. In this case, Japan had earned one quota place through standard qualification, and so they received only one additional place, whereas the other was recovered by sixth-ranked Belgium. Because qualification was complete by 22 October 2019, this allocation was unaffected by the COVID-19 pandemic.
5. Shortly before the start of the games, Finnish cyclist Lotta Henttala withdrew from the race. She was replaced by Alison Jackson from eighth-ranked Canada. Likewise, Swedish competitor Emilia Fahlin withdrew and was replaced by Marta Lach from ninth-ranked Poland.

== Competition format and course ==
The road race was a mass-start, one-day road race event. The courses for the men's and women's road races were revealed in August 2018. The women's race started at Musashinonomori Park in Chōfu, western Tokyo, at 13:00 Japan Standard Time (UTC+9) and finished at the Fuji Speedway circuit in the Shizuoka prefecture. The women's road race was 137 kilometres (85 mi) long with a total elevation gain of 2,692 metres (8,832 ft).

The first part of the men's and women's races were identical. The course first passed through the mostly flat outskirts of Tokyo's metropolitan area. After 40 kilometres (25 mi), the riders gradually climbed towards the foot of the climb to Doushi Road, a 5.9-kilometre (3.7 mi) climb with an average gradient of 5.7 percent. The climb topped out after 80 kilometres (50 mi) of racing at an altitude of 1,121 metres (3,678 ft) above sea level. After reaching Lake Yamanakako in Yamanashi and crossing the Kagosaka Pass, the riders faced a 15-kilometre (9.3 mi) descent and from here, the courses were different for the men's and women's races. Following the descent, the women's race made their way towards the Fuji Speedway circuit, bypassing the climbs of Fuji Sanroku and the Mikuni Pass. The riders contested one and a half laps of the undulating track before crowning the winner at the Fuji Speedway.

== Start list ==
Nations:

Cyclists	Nations
4	Netherlands – Italy – Germany – Australia – United States
3	Belgium – Poland – Canada
2	Denmark – Great Britain – South Africa – Spain – Norway – Japan
1	26 nations

== Race overview ==
As soon as the racing started, Anna Kiesenhofer (Austria) attacked from the peloton. She was soon joined by Carla Oberholzer (South Africa), Vera Looser (Namibia), Omer Shapira (Israel), and Anna Plichta (Poland). Several riders attempted to bridge to the front but they were caught by the peloton. The break was considered unthreatening, and was allowed to build a maximum advantage of around 11 minutes over the favourites before the gap was stabilized. As the road began to go uphill, Looser struggled to follow the pace in the break and she began to drop back. With 88 kilometres (55 mi) to go, Oberholzer also lost contact with her breakaway companions as three riders were left at the front. The trio up front managed to maintain their gap over the peloton as no teams were willing to take up the chase behind, leaning on the extremely strong Netherlands team who likewise failed to pursue. As the peloton neared the foot of the climb to Doushi Road, Emma Norsgaard Jørgensen (Denmark)'s wheel aligned with an expansion joint in the road causing her to lose control and crash. Annemiek van Vleuten (Netherlands) could not evade the fallen rider and went head over, both bicycles becoming entangled. Both riders eventually got back up.

With around 61 kilometres (38 mi) to go, Demi Vollering (Netherlands) attacked from the peloton, sparking a flurry of attacks. However, all the moves were eventually covered while the break still enjoyed a lead of around eight and a half minutes. On the climb to Doushi Road, the lead began to come down as the pace in the peloton started to shed riders out the back. Around 51 kilometres (32 mi) from the finish, van Vleuten made another attack, this time building a gap over the peloton. At this point, the gap to the break up front still stood at around five and a half minutes. Van Vleuten managed to increase her lead to a minute over the peloton while up front, on the Kagosaka Pass, Kiesenhofer dropped Shapira and Plichta, going solo with 41 kilometres (25 mi) still left to race. Kiesenhofer maintained her five-minute advantage over van Vleuten on the descent from the Kagosaka Pass while the peloton was a further minute in arrears. As Kiesenhofer ended the descent, she still held a lead of four and a half minutes over the peloton. A few moments later, Juliette Labous (France) attacked from the peloton and gained a lead of around 20 seconds.

Kiesenhofer soon passed through the finish line at the Fuji Speedway for the first time with 17 kilometres (11 mi) to go, holding a lead of two minutes over Shapira and Plichta, almost four minutes over Labous, and more than four minutes over the peloton. At this point, Netherlands began to set a faster pace, bringing back Labous and closing in on Shapira and Plichta. With 4.5 kilometres (2.8 mi) left, both Shapira and Plichta were finally caught by the peloton; at this point, some of the riders, not having radios as is common in road cycling outside the Olympics, thought that all the breakaway riders had been caught, when in reality Kiesenhofer was still leading by three minutes. 2.1 kilometres (1.3 mi) from the finish, van Vleuten attacked from the peloton, with Elisa Longo Borghini (Italy) going after her. However, van Vleuten continued to maintain her gap over Longo Borghini while up front, but not catching the lone leader. Kiesenhofer soloed to the biggest win of her career, winning the gold medal.

Van Vleuten went on to take the silver medal. She celebrated as she crossed the line, thinking that she won the gold medal. There was controversy afterward because during the race, without radio communication, the organisation had not informed riders properly that Kiesenhofer was in the lead, or by how far. Longo Borghini held on to take the bronze medal.

== Results ==
Result
Rank	#	Cyclist	Nation	Time	Diff.
1st place, gold medalist(s)	48	Anna Kiesenhofer	Austria	3:52:45	
2nd place, silver medalist(s)	2	Annemiek van Vleuten	Netherlands	3:54:00	+ 1:15
3rd place, bronze medalist(s)	7	Elisa Longo Borghini	Italy	3:54:14	+ 1:29
4	20	Lotte Kopecky	Belgium	3:54:24	+ 1:39
5	4	Marianne Vos	Netherlands	3:54:31	+ 1:46
6	11	Lisa Brennauer	Germany	3:54:31	+ 1:46
7	28	Coryn Rivera	United States	3:54:31	+ 1:46
8	6	Marta Cavalli	Italy	3:54:31	+ 1:46
9	57	Olga Zabelinskaya	Uzbekistan	3:54:31	+ 1:46
10	10	Cecilie Uttrup Ludwig	Denmark	3:54:31	+ 1:46
11	22	Lizzie Deignan	Great Britain	3:54:31	+ 1:46
12	33	Margarita Victoria García	Spain	3:54:31	+ 1:46
13	31	Ashleigh Moolman	South Africa	3:54:31	+ 1:46
14	25	Katarzyna Niewiadoma	Poland	3:54:31	+ 1:46
15	1	Anna van der Breggen	Netherlands	3:54:31	+ 1:46
16	43	Karol-Ann Canuel	Canada	3:55:05	+ 2:20
17	50	Alena Amialiusik	Belarus	3:55:05	+ 2:20
18	24	Marta Lach	Poland	3:55:13	+ 2:28
19	40	Eugenia Bujak	Slovenia	3:55:13	+ 2:28
20	41	Christine Majerus	Luxembourg	3:55:13	+ 2:28
21	64	Eri Yonamine	Japan	3:55:13	+ 2:28
22	49	Paula Patiño	Colombia	3:55:15	+ 2:30
23	12	Liane Lippert	Germany	3:55:17	+ 2:32
24	54	Omer Shapira	Israel	3:55:23	+ 2:38
25	3	Demi Vollering	Netherlands	3:55:41	+ 2:56
26	16	Tiffany Cromwell	Australia	3:55:41	+ 2:56
27	26	Anna Plichta	Poland	3:55:58	+ 3:13
28	34	Ane Santesteban	Spain	3:56:04	+ 3:19
29	29	Leah Thomas	United States	3:56:07	+ 3:22
30	36	Juliette Labous	France	3:56:07	+ 3:22
31	27	Chloé Dygert	United States	3:58:51	+ 6:06
32	44	Alison Jackson	Canada	3:59:47	+ 7:02
33	52	Tereza Neumanová	Czech Republic	3:59:47	+ 7:02
34	56	Arlenis Sierra	Cuba	3:59:47	+ 7:02
35	47	Rasa Leleivytė	Lithuania	3:59:47	+ 7:02
36	45	Leah Kirchmann	Canada	3:59:47	+ 7:02
37	37	Katrine Aalerud	Norway	3:59:52	+ 7:07
38	67	Na Ah-reum	South Korea	4:01:08	+ 8:23
39	39	Tamara Dronova	ROC	4:01:08	+ 8:23
40	17	Sarah Gigante	Australia	4:01:08	+ 8:23
41	13	Hannah Ludwig	Germany	4:01:08	+ 8:23
42	21	Julie Van de Velde	Belgium	4:01:08	+ 8:23
43	63	Hiromi Kaneko	Japan	4:01:08	+ 8:23
44	5	Marta Bastianelli	Italy	4:02:16	+ 9:31
45	30	Ruth Winder	United States	4:02:16	+ 9:31
46	35	Marlen Reusser	Switzerland	4:02:16	+ 9:31
47	15	Grace Brown	Australia	4:02:16	+ 9:31
48	8	Soraya Paladin	Italy	4:08:40	+ 15:55
—	9	Emma Norsgaard Jørgensen	Denmark	DNF	
—	19	Valerie Demey	Belgium	DNF	
—	38	Stine Borgli	Norway	DNF	
—	66	Teniel Campbell	Trinidad and Tobago	DNF	
—	62	Antri Christoforou	Cyprus	DNF	
—	61	Sun Jiajun	China	DNF	
—	53	Agua Marina Espínola	Paraguay	DNF	
—	18	Amanda Spratt	Australia	DNF	
—	14	Trixi Worrack	Germany	DNF	
—	23	Anna Shackley	Great Britain	DNF	
—	32	Carla Oberholzer	South Africa	DNF	
—	42	Valeriya Kononenko	Ukraine	DNF	
—	46	Jutatip Maneephan	Thailand	DNF	
—	51	Vera Looser	Namibia	DNF	
—	55	Lizbeth Salazar	Mexico	DNF	
—	58	Selam Amha	Ethiopia	DNF	
—	59	Mosana Debesay	Eritrea	DNF	
—	60	María José Vargas	Costa Rica	DNF	
—	65	Catalina Soto	Chile	DNF	
