= Eveline Bodenmüller =

Swiss equestrian

Personal information
- Nationality: Switzerland
- Born: 30 September 1985 (age 39); Zürich, Switzerland

Sport
- Sport: Equestrian

Eveline Bodenmüller (born 30 September 1985) is a Swiss equestrian. She competed in the 2020 Summer Olympics.
