= Musashinonomori Park =

Park in Tokyo, Japan

Coordinates: 35°40′36.1″N 139°31′23.7″E

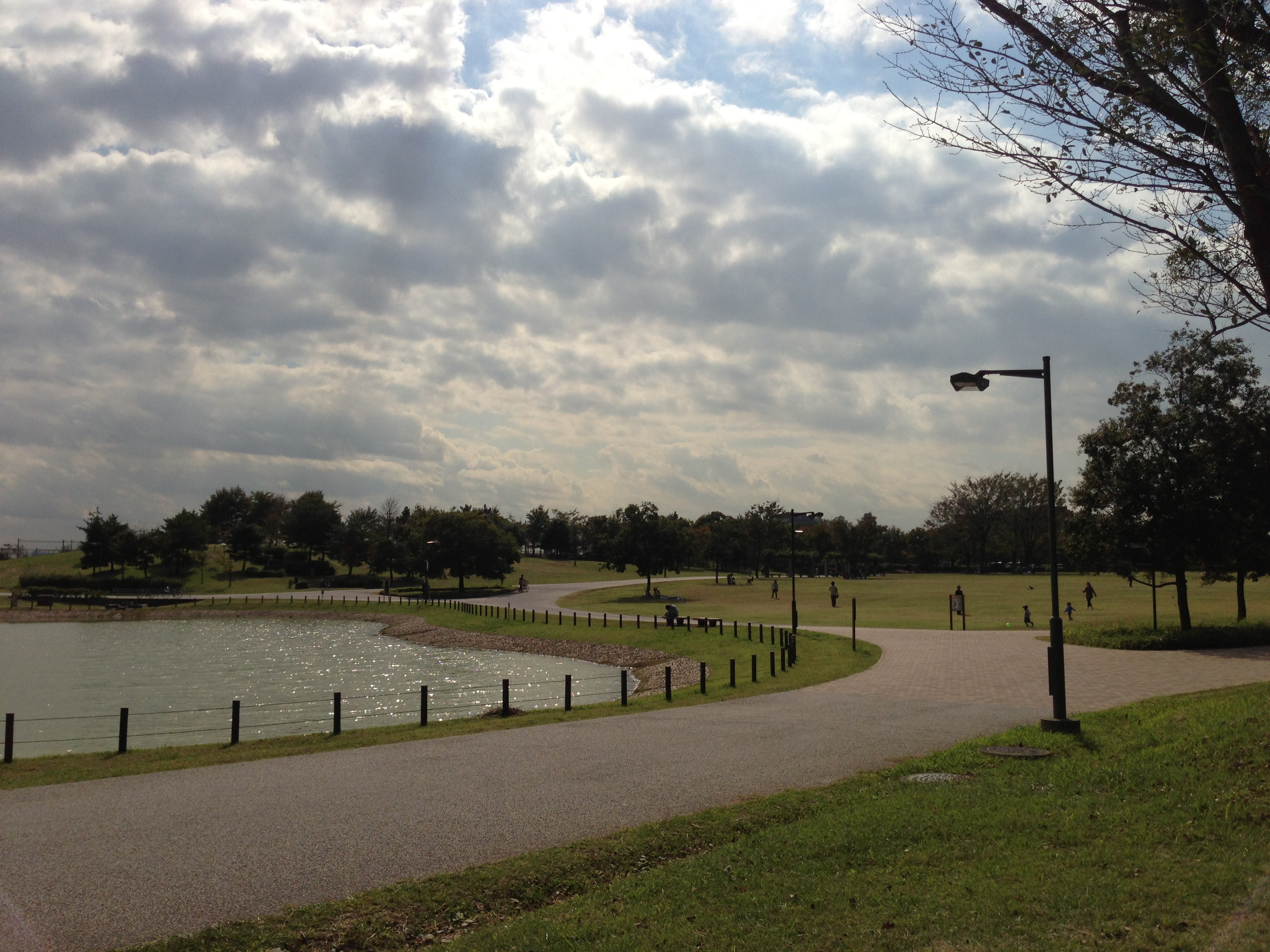

- Location within Tokyo Location within Japan
- Location: Mitaka, Fuchū and Chōfu; Tokyo, Japan.
- Area: 347,036.01 square metres (85.75447 acres)
- Created: April 1, 2000

Musashinonomori Park (武蔵野の森公園, Musashino no mori kōen) is a park in the Musashino región of the Japanese metropolis of Tokyo.

== Location ==
The park is located in the border area of the cities of Mitaka, Fuchū and Chōfu next to Chōfu Airport and close to Musashino Forest Sport Plaza and Ajinomoto Stadium.

The park is a wooded area, with sports facilities and two areas for parking cars. It is administered by the Tokyo Metropolitan Park Association (東京 都 公園 協会).

== Inauguration ==
The park was opened on April 1, 2000, and is surrounded by the "Musashino Forest".

As part of the 2020 Summer Olympics, the start of men's and women's road races in cycling took place in Musashinonomori Park.
